

413001–413100 

|-bgcolor=#fefefe
| 413001 ||  || — || October 31, 1999 || Kitt Peak || Spacewatch || — || align=right data-sort-value="0.72" | 720 m || 
|-id=002 bgcolor=#FFC2E0
| 413002 ||  || — || November 11, 1999 || Catalina || CSS || AMO || align=right data-sort-value="0.61" | 610 m || 
|-id=003 bgcolor=#fefefe
| 413003 ||  || — || November 3, 1999 || Kitt Peak || Spacewatch || — || align=right data-sort-value="0.74" | 740 m || 
|-id=004 bgcolor=#fefefe
| 413004 ||  || — || November 4, 1999 || Kitt Peak || Spacewatch || — || align=right data-sort-value="0.65" | 650 m || 
|-id=005 bgcolor=#d6d6d6
| 413005 ||  || — || November 10, 1999 || Kitt Peak || Spacewatch || — || align=right | 2.6 km || 
|-id=006 bgcolor=#d6d6d6
| 413006 ||  || — || November 12, 1999 || Kitt Peak || Spacewatch || 3:2 || align=right | 2.8 km || 
|-id=007 bgcolor=#fefefe
| 413007 ||  || — || October 19, 1999 || Kitt Peak || Spacewatch || — || align=right data-sort-value="0.78" | 780 m || 
|-id=008 bgcolor=#fefefe
| 413008 ||  || — || November 3, 1999 || Catalina || CSS || — || align=right data-sort-value="0.86" | 860 m || 
|-id=009 bgcolor=#fefefe
| 413009 ||  || — || November 12, 1999 || Socorro || LINEAR || — || align=right data-sort-value="0.73" | 730 m || 
|-id=010 bgcolor=#FA8072
| 413010 ||  || — || February 2, 2000 || Socorro || LINEAR || — || align=right | 1.2 km || 
|-id=011 bgcolor=#d6d6d6
| 413011 ||  || — || March 30, 2000 || Prescott || P. G. Comba || — || align=right | 4.1 km || 
|-id=012 bgcolor=#E9E9E9
| 413012 ||  || — || April 5, 2000 || Socorro || LINEAR || — || align=right | 1.4 km || 
|-id=013 bgcolor=#fefefe
| 413013 ||  || — || April 26, 2000 || Anderson Mesa || LONEOS || — || align=right data-sort-value="0.71" | 710 m || 
|-id=014 bgcolor=#fefefe
| 413014 ||  || — || July 5, 2000 || Kitt Peak || Spacewatch || — || align=right data-sort-value="0.83" | 830 m || 
|-id=015 bgcolor=#E9E9E9
| 413015 ||  || — || August 24, 2000 || Socorro || LINEAR || — || align=right | 2.8 km || 
|-id=016 bgcolor=#fefefe
| 413016 ||  || — || August 21, 2000 || Anderson Mesa || LONEOS || — || align=right data-sort-value="0.87" | 870 m || 
|-id=017 bgcolor=#E9E9E9
| 413017 ||  || — || August 29, 2000 || Socorro || LINEAR || — || align=right | 2.2 km || 
|-id=018 bgcolor=#E9E9E9
| 413018 ||  || — || September 23, 2000 || Socorro || LINEAR || — || align=right | 2.6 km || 
|-id=019 bgcolor=#fefefe
| 413019 ||  || — || September 23, 2000 || Socorro || LINEAR || V || align=right data-sort-value="0.67" | 670 m || 
|-id=020 bgcolor=#E9E9E9
| 413020 ||  || — || September 22, 2000 || Socorro || LINEAR || — || align=right | 3.8 km || 
|-id=021 bgcolor=#FFC2E0
| 413021 ||  || — || September 28, 2000 || Socorro || LINEAR || AMO || align=right data-sort-value="0.52" | 520 m || 
|-id=022 bgcolor=#E9E9E9
| 413022 ||  || — || September 24, 2000 || Socorro || LINEAR || — || align=right | 2.0 km || 
|-id=023 bgcolor=#E9E9E9
| 413023 ||  || — || October 5, 2000 || Kitt Peak || Spacewatch || — || align=right | 2.9 km || 
|-id=024 bgcolor=#fefefe
| 413024 ||  || — || October 1, 2000 || Socorro || LINEAR || — || align=right data-sort-value="0.71" | 710 m || 
|-id=025 bgcolor=#fefefe
| 413025 ||  || — || October 24, 2000 || Socorro || LINEAR || — || align=right data-sort-value="0.96" | 960 m || 
|-id=026 bgcolor=#fefefe
| 413026 ||  || — || October 24, 2000 || Socorro || LINEAR || — || align=right | 1.0 km || 
|-id=027 bgcolor=#E9E9E9
| 413027 ||  || — || October 25, 2000 || Socorro || LINEAR || — || align=right | 2.5 km || 
|-id=028 bgcolor=#E9E9E9
| 413028 ||  || — || October 25, 2000 || Socorro || LINEAR || DOR || align=right | 3.8 km || 
|-id=029 bgcolor=#E9E9E9
| 413029 ||  || — || October 31, 2000 || Socorro || LINEAR || — || align=right | 2.4 km || 
|-id=030 bgcolor=#fefefe
| 413030 ||  || — || November 19, 2000 || Socorro || LINEAR || PHO || align=right | 1.1 km || 
|-id=031 bgcolor=#E9E9E9
| 413031 ||  || — || November 19, 2000 || Socorro || LINEAR || — || align=right | 3.2 km || 
|-id=032 bgcolor=#fefefe
| 413032 ||  || — || December 4, 2000 || Socorro || LINEAR || — || align=right data-sort-value="0.94" | 940 m || 
|-id=033 bgcolor=#fefefe
| 413033 Aerts ||  ||  || December 4, 2000 || Uccle || T. Pauwels || — || align=right data-sort-value="0.99" | 990 m || 
|-id=034 bgcolor=#fefefe
| 413034 ||  || — || December 28, 2000 || Kitt Peak || Spacewatch || — || align=right data-sort-value="0.60" | 600 m || 
|-id=035 bgcolor=#d6d6d6
| 413035 ||  || — || January 15, 2001 || Kitt Peak || Spacewatch || SHU3:2 || align=right | 5.8 km || 
|-id=036 bgcolor=#E9E9E9
| 413036 ||  || — || May 18, 2001 || Socorro || LINEAR || — || align=right | 1.1 km || 
|-id=037 bgcolor=#d6d6d6
| 413037 ||  || — || May 25, 2001 || Socorro || LINEAR || — || align=right | 3.9 km || 
|-id=038 bgcolor=#FFC2E0
| 413038 ||  || — || June 16, 2001 || Anderson Mesa || LONEOS || AMO +1km || align=right | 1.2 km || 
|-id=039 bgcolor=#E9E9E9
| 413039 ||  || — || July 13, 2001 || Palomar || NEAT || — || align=right | 1.1 km || 
|-id=040 bgcolor=#E9E9E9
| 413040 ||  || — || July 24, 2001 || Palomar || NEAT || — || align=right | 1.5 km || 
|-id=041 bgcolor=#E9E9E9
| 413041 ||  || — || August 11, 2001 || Palomar || NEAT || — || align=right | 2.2 km || 
|-id=042 bgcolor=#E9E9E9
| 413042 ||  || — || August 12, 2001 || Haleakala || NEAT || — || align=right | 1.6 km || 
|-id=043 bgcolor=#E9E9E9
| 413043 ||  || — || August 17, 2001 || Socorro || LINEAR || — || align=right | 1.3 km || 
|-id=044 bgcolor=#FA8072
| 413044 ||  || — || August 23, 2001 || Socorro || LINEAR || — || align=right | 1.7 km || 
|-id=045 bgcolor=#FA8072
| 413045 ||  || — || August 24, 2001 || Anderson Mesa || LONEOS || H || align=right data-sort-value="0.77" | 770 m || 
|-id=046 bgcolor=#E9E9E9
| 413046 ||  || — || August 23, 2001 || Anderson Mesa || LONEOS || — || align=right | 1.1 km || 
|-id=047 bgcolor=#E9E9E9
| 413047 ||  || — || August 24, 2001 || Socorro || LINEAR || — || align=right | 1.4 km || 
|-id=048 bgcolor=#E9E9E9
| 413048 ||  || — || August 21, 2001 || Haleakala || NEAT || ADE || align=right | 2.4 km || 
|-id=049 bgcolor=#E9E9E9
| 413049 ||  || — || August 22, 2001 || Haleakala || NEAT || ADE || align=right | 2.6 km || 
|-id=050 bgcolor=#E9E9E9
| 413050 ||  || — || August 24, 2001 || Anderson Mesa || LONEOS || — || align=right | 1.4 km || 
|-id=051 bgcolor=#E9E9E9
| 413051 ||  || — || August 19, 2001 || Socorro || LINEAR || — || align=right | 1.7 km || 
|-id=052 bgcolor=#E9E9E9
| 413052 ||  || — || August 25, 2001 || Socorro || LINEAR || — || align=right | 1.8 km || 
|-id=053 bgcolor=#E9E9E9
| 413053 ||  || — || September 8, 2001 || Socorro || LINEAR || MAR || align=right | 1.4 km || 
|-id=054 bgcolor=#E9E9E9
| 413054 ||  || — || September 8, 2001 || Socorro || LINEAR || — || align=right | 1.6 km || 
|-id=055 bgcolor=#fefefe
| 413055 ||  || — || September 11, 2001 || Socorro || LINEAR || — || align=right | 1.1 km || 
|-id=056 bgcolor=#E9E9E9
| 413056 ||  || — || August 27, 2001 || Anderson Mesa || LONEOS || — || align=right | 1.7 km || 
|-id=057 bgcolor=#E9E9E9
| 413057 ||  || — || September 12, 2001 || Socorro || LINEAR || (5) || align=right data-sort-value="0.98" | 980 m || 
|-id=058 bgcolor=#fefefe
| 413058 ||  || — || September 12, 2001 || Socorro || LINEAR || — || align=right data-sort-value="0.79" | 790 m || 
|-id=059 bgcolor=#E9E9E9
| 413059 ||  || — || September 12, 2001 || Socorro || LINEAR || — || align=right | 2.1 km || 
|-id=060 bgcolor=#fefefe
| 413060 ||  || — || September 12, 2001 || Socorro || LINEAR || — || align=right data-sort-value="0.65" | 650 m || 
|-id=061 bgcolor=#fefefe
| 413061 ||  || — || September 8, 2001 || Socorro || LINEAR || — || align=right data-sort-value="0.80" | 800 m || 
|-id=062 bgcolor=#E9E9E9
| 413062 ||  || — || September 10, 2001 || Anderson Mesa || LONEOS || — || align=right | 1.7 km || 
|-id=063 bgcolor=#E9E9E9
| 413063 ||  || — || September 16, 2001 || Socorro || LINEAR || — || align=right | 1.6 km || 
|-id=064 bgcolor=#E9E9E9
| 413064 ||  || — || September 12, 2001 || Socorro || LINEAR || — || align=right | 1.4 km || 
|-id=065 bgcolor=#E9E9E9
| 413065 ||  || — || August 22, 2001 || Kitt Peak || Spacewatch || — || align=right | 1.3 km || 
|-id=066 bgcolor=#E9E9E9
| 413066 ||  || — || September 18, 2001 || Palomar || NEAT || — || align=right | 1.6 km || 
|-id=067 bgcolor=#E9E9E9
| 413067 ||  || — || August 24, 2001 || Anderson Mesa || LONEOS || — || align=right | 1.4 km || 
|-id=068 bgcolor=#E9E9E9
| 413068 ||  || — || September 16, 2001 || Socorro || LINEAR || — || align=right | 1.3 km || 
|-id=069 bgcolor=#E9E9E9
| 413069 ||  || — || September 16, 2001 || Socorro || LINEAR || — || align=right | 1.9 km || 
|-id=070 bgcolor=#E9E9E9
| 413070 ||  || — || September 16, 2001 || Socorro || LINEAR || — || align=right | 1.8 km || 
|-id=071 bgcolor=#E9E9E9
| 413071 ||  || — || September 19, 2001 || Socorro || LINEAR || — || align=right data-sort-value="0.97" | 970 m || 
|-id=072 bgcolor=#E9E9E9
| 413072 ||  || — || September 19, 2001 || Socorro || LINEAR || JUNcritical || align=right data-sort-value="0.88" | 880 m || 
|-id=073 bgcolor=#E9E9E9
| 413073 ||  || — || September 25, 2001 || Socorro || LINEAR || — || align=right | 2.8 km || 
|-id=074 bgcolor=#E9E9E9
| 413074 ||  || — || September 20, 2001 || Socorro || LINEAR || (5) || align=right data-sort-value="0.82" | 820 m || 
|-id=075 bgcolor=#E9E9E9
| 413075 ||  || — || September 20, 2001 || Socorro || LINEAR || (1547) || align=right | 2.1 km || 
|-id=076 bgcolor=#E9E9E9
| 413076 ||  || — || September 20, 2001 || Socorro || LINEAR || — || align=right | 1.2 km || 
|-id=077 bgcolor=#E9E9E9
| 413077 ||  || — || August 26, 2001 || Anderson Mesa || LONEOS || EUN || align=right | 1.4 km || 
|-id=078 bgcolor=#E9E9E9
| 413078 ||  || — || September 25, 2001 || Socorro || LINEAR || — || align=right | 1.8 km || 
|-id=079 bgcolor=#E9E9E9
| 413079 ||  || — || September 17, 2001 || Palomar || NEAT || EUN || align=right | 2.0 km || 
|-id=080 bgcolor=#fefefe
| 413080 ||  || — || September 20, 2001 || Socorro || LINEAR || — || align=right data-sort-value="0.83" | 830 m || 
|-id=081 bgcolor=#E9E9E9
| 413081 ||  || — || October 14, 2001 || Socorro || LINEAR || — || align=right | 1.7 km || 
|-id=082 bgcolor=#E9E9E9
| 413082 ||  || — || October 15, 2001 || Socorro || LINEAR || — || align=right | 1.8 km || 
|-id=083 bgcolor=#fefefe
| 413083 ||  || — || October 14, 2001 || Socorro || LINEAR || H || align=right data-sort-value="0.68" | 680 m || 
|-id=084 bgcolor=#E9E9E9
| 413084 ||  || — || October 12, 2001 || Haleakala || NEAT || — || align=right | 2.9 km || 
|-id=085 bgcolor=#E9E9E9
| 413085 ||  || — || September 12, 2001 || Socorro || LINEAR || HNS || align=right | 1.4 km || 
|-id=086 bgcolor=#E9E9E9
| 413086 ||  || — || October 15, 2001 || Socorro || LINEAR || ADE || align=right | 2.1 km || 
|-id=087 bgcolor=#E9E9E9
| 413087 ||  || — || October 14, 2001 || Socorro || LINEAR || — || align=right | 1.1 km || 
|-id=088 bgcolor=#E9E9E9
| 413088 ||  || — || September 23, 2001 || Socorro || LINEAR || — || align=right | 1.3 km || 
|-id=089 bgcolor=#E9E9E9
| 413089 ||  || — || October 14, 2001 || Apache Point || SDSS || — || align=right | 1.5 km || 
|-id=090 bgcolor=#E9E9E9
| 413090 ||  || — || October 17, 2001 || Socorro || LINEAR || BAR || align=right | 1.8 km || 
|-id=091 bgcolor=#FFC2E0
| 413091 ||  || — || October 23, 2001 || Palomar || NEAT || AMO +1kmcritical || align=right data-sort-value="0.81" | 810 m || 
|-id=092 bgcolor=#E9E9E9
| 413092 ||  || — || October 16, 2001 || Kitt Peak || Spacewatch || — || align=right | 1.3 km || 
|-id=093 bgcolor=#E9E9E9
| 413093 ||  || — || October 16, 2001 || Socorro || LINEAR || — || align=right | 1.4 km || 
|-id=094 bgcolor=#fefefe
| 413094 ||  || — || October 17, 2001 || Socorro || LINEAR || — || align=right data-sort-value="0.66" | 660 m || 
|-id=095 bgcolor=#fefefe
| 413095 ||  || — || October 17, 2001 || Socorro || LINEAR || — || align=right data-sort-value="0.81" | 810 m || 
|-id=096 bgcolor=#fefefe
| 413096 ||  || — || September 20, 2001 || Socorro || LINEAR || — || align=right data-sort-value="0.70" | 700 m || 
|-id=097 bgcolor=#E9E9E9
| 413097 ||  || — || September 20, 2001 || Socorro || LINEAR || — || align=right | 2.2 km || 
|-id=098 bgcolor=#E9E9E9
| 413098 ||  || — || October 18, 2001 || Palomar || NEAT || — || align=right | 2.2 km || 
|-id=099 bgcolor=#E9E9E9
| 413099 ||  || — || October 17, 2001 || Socorro || LINEAR || — || align=right | 1.5 km || 
|-id=100 bgcolor=#E9E9E9
| 413100 ||  || — || October 20, 2001 || Socorro || LINEAR || — || align=right | 1.5 km || 
|}

413101–413200 

|-bgcolor=#E9E9E9
| 413101 ||  || — || October 21, 2001 || Socorro || LINEAR || MIS || align=right | 2.5 km || 
|-id=102 bgcolor=#E9E9E9
| 413102 ||  || — || October 13, 2001 || Kitt Peak || Spacewatch || — || align=right | 1.8 km || 
|-id=103 bgcolor=#E9E9E9
| 413103 ||  || — || October 10, 2001 || Kitt Peak || Spacewatch || — || align=right | 1.2 km || 
|-id=104 bgcolor=#E9E9E9
| 413104 ||  || — || October 23, 2001 || Socorro || LINEAR || — || align=right | 1.8 km || 
|-id=105 bgcolor=#fefefe
| 413105 ||  || — || October 23, 2001 || Socorro || LINEAR || — || align=right data-sort-value="0.71" | 710 m || 
|-id=106 bgcolor=#E9E9E9
| 413106 ||  || — || October 21, 2001 || Socorro || LINEAR || — || align=right | 1.4 km || 
|-id=107 bgcolor=#E9E9E9
| 413107 ||  || — || October 17, 2001 || Kitt Peak || Spacewatch || — || align=right | 1.7 km || 
|-id=108 bgcolor=#fefefe
| 413108 ||  || — || November 9, 2001 || Socorro || LINEAR || — || align=right | 1.0 km || 
|-id=109 bgcolor=#FA8072
| 413109 ||  || — || November 11, 2001 || Socorro || LINEAR || H || align=right | 1.0 km || 
|-id=110 bgcolor=#E9E9E9
| 413110 ||  || — || November 10, 2001 || Socorro || LINEAR || — || align=right | 1.7 km || 
|-id=111 bgcolor=#E9E9E9
| 413111 ||  || — || November 10, 2001 || Socorro || LINEAR || — || align=right | 2.3 km || 
|-id=112 bgcolor=#E9E9E9
| 413112 ||  || — || November 12, 2001 || Kvistaberg || UDAS || — || align=right | 2.4 km || 
|-id=113 bgcolor=#E9E9E9
| 413113 ||  || — || November 12, 2001 || Socorro || LINEAR || — || align=right | 2.0 km || 
|-id=114 bgcolor=#E9E9E9
| 413114 ||  || — || November 14, 2001 || Kitt Peak || Spacewatch || ADE || align=right | 2.1 km || 
|-id=115 bgcolor=#d6d6d6
| 413115 ||  || — || November 11, 2001 || Apache Point || SDSS || 7:4 || align=right | 3.2 km || 
|-id=116 bgcolor=#E9E9E9
| 413116 ||  || — || November 17, 2001 || Socorro || LINEAR || — || align=right | 1.7 km || 
|-id=117 bgcolor=#fefefe
| 413117 ||  || — || November 17, 2001 || Socorro || LINEAR || — || align=right data-sort-value="0.87" | 870 m || 
|-id=118 bgcolor=#E9E9E9
| 413118 ||  || — || November 17, 2001 || Socorro || LINEAR || MIS || align=right | 2.1 km || 
|-id=119 bgcolor=#E9E9E9
| 413119 ||  || — || November 18, 2001 || Socorro || LINEAR || — || align=right | 1.9 km || 
|-id=120 bgcolor=#E9E9E9
| 413120 ||  || — || November 18, 2001 || Socorro || LINEAR || — || align=right | 1.4 km || 
|-id=121 bgcolor=#E9E9E9
| 413121 ||  || — || October 26, 2001 || Socorro || LINEAR || — || align=right | 1.5 km || 
|-id=122 bgcolor=#fefefe
| 413122 ||  || — || November 18, 2001 || Kitt Peak || Spacewatch || — || align=right data-sort-value="0.71" | 710 m || 
|-id=123 bgcolor=#FFC2E0
| 413123 ||  || — || December 9, 2001 || Socorro || LINEAR || AMOcritical || align=right | 1.3 km || 
|-id=124 bgcolor=#fefefe
| 413124 ||  || — || December 8, 2001 || Socorro || LINEAR || H || align=right data-sort-value="0.99" | 990 m || 
|-id=125 bgcolor=#fefefe
| 413125 ||  || — || December 5, 2001 || Haleakala || NEAT || — || align=right data-sort-value="0.96" | 960 m || 
|-id=126 bgcolor=#E9E9E9
| 413126 ||  || — || December 14, 2001 || Uccle || H. Boffin || — || align=right | 2.2 km || 
|-id=127 bgcolor=#E9E9E9
| 413127 ||  || — || December 10, 2001 || Socorro || LINEAR || JUN || align=right | 1.3 km || 
|-id=128 bgcolor=#fefefe
| 413128 ||  || — || December 15, 2001 || Socorro || LINEAR || H || align=right data-sort-value="0.90" | 900 m || 
|-id=129 bgcolor=#E9E9E9
| 413129 ||  || — || December 14, 2001 || Socorro || LINEAR || — || align=right | 1.1 km || 
|-id=130 bgcolor=#fefefe
| 413130 ||  || — || December 14, 2001 || Socorro || LINEAR || — || align=right data-sort-value="0.97" | 970 m || 
|-id=131 bgcolor=#E9E9E9
| 413131 ||  || — || December 14, 2001 || Socorro || LINEAR || — || align=right | 1.5 km || 
|-id=132 bgcolor=#E9E9E9
| 413132 ||  || — || November 17, 2001 || Kitt Peak || Spacewatch || — || align=right | 2.1 km || 
|-id=133 bgcolor=#E9E9E9
| 413133 ||  || — || December 18, 2001 || Socorro || LINEAR || — || align=right | 4.9 km || 
|-id=134 bgcolor=#fefefe
| 413134 ||  || — || November 20, 2001 || Socorro || LINEAR || H || align=right data-sort-value="0.83" | 830 m || 
|-id=135 bgcolor=#E9E9E9
| 413135 ||  || — || December 18, 2001 || Socorro || LINEAR || — || align=right | 1.5 km || 
|-id=136 bgcolor=#E9E9E9
| 413136 ||  || — || December 18, 2001 || Socorro || LINEAR || — || align=right | 2.0 km || 
|-id=137 bgcolor=#E9E9E9
| 413137 ||  || — || December 18, 2001 || Socorro || LINEAR || — || align=right | 1.3 km || 
|-id=138 bgcolor=#E9E9E9
| 413138 ||  || — || December 17, 2001 || Palomar || NEAT || — || align=right | 2.0 km || 
|-id=139 bgcolor=#E9E9E9
| 413139 ||  || — || January 9, 2002 || Socorro || LINEAR || — || align=right | 2.1 km || 
|-id=140 bgcolor=#E9E9E9
| 413140 ||  || — || January 12, 2002 || Kitt Peak || Spacewatch || — || align=right | 1.8 km || 
|-id=141 bgcolor=#E9E9E9
| 413141 ||  || — || January 8, 2002 || Socorro || LINEAR ||  || align=right | 2.0 km || 
|-id=142 bgcolor=#fefefe
| 413142 ||  || — || February 7, 2002 || Socorro || LINEAR || — || align=right data-sort-value="0.97" | 970 m || 
|-id=143 bgcolor=#fefefe
| 413143 ||  || — || February 7, 2002 || Socorro || LINEAR || — || align=right data-sort-value="0.97" | 970 m || 
|-id=144 bgcolor=#E9E9E9
| 413144 ||  || — || February 7, 2002 || Socorro || LINEAR || GEF || align=right | 1.5 km || 
|-id=145 bgcolor=#E9E9E9
| 413145 ||  || — || December 23, 2001 || Kitt Peak || Spacewatch || — || align=right | 2.3 km || 
|-id=146 bgcolor=#E9E9E9
| 413146 ||  || — || January 5, 2002 || Kitt Peak || Spacewatch || — || align=right | 2.1 km || 
|-id=147 bgcolor=#fefefe
| 413147 ||  || — || February 10, 2002 || Socorro || LINEAR || — || align=right data-sort-value="0.89" | 890 m || 
|-id=148 bgcolor=#fefefe
| 413148 ||  || — || February 6, 2002 || Kitt Peak || M. W. Buie || — || align=right data-sort-value="0.93" | 930 m || 
|-id=149 bgcolor=#fefefe
| 413149 ||  || — || February 5, 2002 || Palomar || NEAT || — || align=right data-sort-value="0.67" | 670 m || 
|-id=150 bgcolor=#E9E9E9
| 413150 ||  || — || February 15, 2002 || Socorro || LINEAR || — || align=right | 2.7 km || 
|-id=151 bgcolor=#d6d6d6
| 413151 ||  || — || March 5, 2002 || Kitt Peak || Spacewatch || KOR || align=right | 1.2 km || 
|-id=152 bgcolor=#fefefe
| 413152 ||  || — || March 13, 2002 || Socorro || LINEAR || — || align=right | 1.3 km || 
|-id=153 bgcolor=#fefefe
| 413153 ||  || — || March 10, 2002 || Kitt Peak || Spacewatch || — || align=right data-sort-value="0.95" | 950 m || 
|-id=154 bgcolor=#fefefe
| 413154 ||  || — || March 12, 2002 || Palomar || NEAT || — || align=right data-sort-value="0.85" | 850 m || 
|-id=155 bgcolor=#fefefe
| 413155 ||  || — || March 16, 2002 || Socorro || LINEAR || H || align=right data-sort-value="0.96" | 960 m || 
|-id=156 bgcolor=#fefefe
| 413156 ||  || — || April 4, 2002 || Kitt Peak || Spacewatch || — || align=right | 1.3 km || 
|-id=157 bgcolor=#fefefe
| 413157 ||  || — || April 8, 2002 || Palomar || NEAT || — || align=right data-sort-value="0.90" | 900 m || 
|-id=158 bgcolor=#d6d6d6
| 413158 ||  || — || April 8, 2002 || Palomar || NEAT || — || align=right | 2.5 km || 
|-id=159 bgcolor=#fefefe
| 413159 ||  || — || April 10, 2002 || Socorro || LINEAR || — || align=right data-sort-value="0.95" | 950 m || 
|-id=160 bgcolor=#fefefe
| 413160 ||  || — || April 12, 2002 || Socorro || LINEAR || (2076) || align=right | 1.0 km || 
|-id=161 bgcolor=#fefefe
| 413161 ||  || — || April 5, 2002 || Palomar || NEAT || — || align=right data-sort-value="0.83" | 830 m || 
|-id=162 bgcolor=#fefefe
| 413162 ||  || — || April 9, 2002 || Palomar || NEAT || — || align=right data-sort-value="0.77" | 770 m || 
|-id=163 bgcolor=#d6d6d6
| 413163 ||  || — || April 21, 2002 || Kitt Peak || Spacewatch || — || align=right | 3.8 km || 
|-id=164 bgcolor=#d6d6d6
| 413164 ||  || — || July 13, 2002 || Xinglong || SCAP || — || align=right | 3.9 km || 
|-id=165 bgcolor=#d6d6d6
| 413165 ||  || — || July 2, 2002 || Palomar || NEAT || THB || align=right | 5.8 km || 
|-id=166 bgcolor=#d6d6d6
| 413166 ||  || — || August 8, 2002 || Palomar || S. F. Hönig || — || align=right | 2.9 km || 
|-id=167 bgcolor=#d6d6d6
| 413167 ||  || — || August 11, 2002 || Palomar || NEAT || — || align=right | 3.9 km || 
|-id=168 bgcolor=#d6d6d6
| 413168 ||  || — || August 28, 2002 || Palomar || R. Matson || — || align=right | 2.7 km || 
|-id=169 bgcolor=#d6d6d6
| 413169 ||  || — || August 30, 2002 || Palomar || NEAT || Tj (2.99) || align=right | 3.7 km || 
|-id=170 bgcolor=#d6d6d6
| 413170 ||  || — || August 30, 2002 || Palomar || NEAT || VER || align=right | 2.7 km || 
|-id=171 bgcolor=#fefefe
| 413171 ||  || — || August 17, 2002 || Palomar || NEAT || NYS || align=right data-sort-value="0.60" | 600 m || 
|-id=172 bgcolor=#d6d6d6
| 413172 ||  || — || August 30, 2002 || Palomar || NEAT || — || align=right | 3.0 km || 
|-id=173 bgcolor=#d6d6d6
| 413173 ||  || — || August 18, 2002 || Palomar || NEAT || — || align=right | 3.6 km || 
|-id=174 bgcolor=#d6d6d6
| 413174 ||  || — || August 16, 2002 || Palomar || NEAT || VER || align=right | 2.7 km || 
|-id=175 bgcolor=#fefefe
| 413175 ||  || — || August 18, 2002 || Palomar || NEAT || NYS || align=right data-sort-value="0.57" | 570 m || 
|-id=176 bgcolor=#fefefe
| 413176 ||  || — || August 26, 2002 || Palomar || NEAT || — || align=right | 1.7 km || 
|-id=177 bgcolor=#fefefe
| 413177 ||  || — || August 17, 2002 || Palomar || NEAT || — || align=right data-sort-value="0.88" | 880 m || 
|-id=178 bgcolor=#fefefe
| 413178 ||  || — || August 29, 2002 || Palomar || NEAT || MAS || align=right data-sort-value="0.69" | 690 m || 
|-id=179 bgcolor=#d6d6d6
| 413179 ||  || — || August 16, 2002 || Palomar || NEAT || — || align=right | 3.1 km || 
|-id=180 bgcolor=#d6d6d6
| 413180 ||  || — || September 2, 2002 || Palomar || NEAT || — || align=right | 3.6 km || 
|-id=181 bgcolor=#d6d6d6
| 413181 ||  || — || August 12, 2002 || Socorro || LINEAR || — || align=right | 3.3 km || 
|-id=182 bgcolor=#d6d6d6
| 413182 ||  || — || September 11, 2002 || Palomar || M. White, M. Collins || — || align=right | 2.7 km || 
|-id=183 bgcolor=#fefefe
| 413183 ||  || — || September 10, 2002 || Palomar || NEAT || — || align=right | 1.0 km || 
|-id=184 bgcolor=#d6d6d6
| 413184 ||  || — || September 15, 2002 || Palomar || NEAT || — || align=right | 2.9 km || 
|-id=185 bgcolor=#d6d6d6
| 413185 ||  || — || September 15, 2002 || Palomar || NEAT || THM || align=right | 2.1 km || 
|-id=186 bgcolor=#fefefe
| 413186 ||  || — || September 1, 2002 || Palomar || NEAT || — || align=right data-sort-value="0.75" | 750 m || 
|-id=187 bgcolor=#fefefe
| 413187 ||  || — || September 3, 2002 || Palomar || NEAT || — || align=right | 1.8 km || 
|-id=188 bgcolor=#d6d6d6
| 413188 ||  || — || October 4, 2002 || Apache Point || SDSS || — || align=right | 3.1 km || 
|-id=189 bgcolor=#d6d6d6
| 413189 ||  || — || October 4, 2002 || Apache Point || SDSS || — || align=right | 5.0 km || 
|-id=190 bgcolor=#d6d6d6
| 413190 ||  || — || October 10, 2002 || Apache Point || SDSS || — || align=right | 3.0 km || 
|-id=191 bgcolor=#d6d6d6
| 413191 ||  || — || October 10, 2002 || Apache Point || SDSS || — || align=right | 3.1 km || 
|-id=192 bgcolor=#FFC2E0
| 413192 ||  || — || November 14, 2002 || Palomar || NEAT || AMO +1km || align=right | 4.0 km || 
|-id=193 bgcolor=#E9E9E9
| 413193 ||  || — || November 12, 2002 || Socorro || LINEAR || (5) || align=right | 1.1 km || 
|-id=194 bgcolor=#d6d6d6
| 413194 ||  || — || November 28, 2002 || Anderson Mesa || LONEOS || — || align=right | 4.1 km || 
|-id=195 bgcolor=#C2FFFF
| 413195 ||  || — || November 24, 2002 || Palomar || NEAT || L5 || align=right | 7.8 km || 
|-id=196 bgcolor=#fefefe
| 413196 ||  || — || December 5, 2002 || Socorro || LINEAR || H || align=right | 1.0 km || 
|-id=197 bgcolor=#d6d6d6
| 413197 ||  || — || December 11, 2002 || Socorro || LINEAR || — || align=right | 3.5 km || 
|-id=198 bgcolor=#E9E9E9
| 413198 ||  || — || December 10, 2002 || Palomar || NEAT || — || align=right data-sort-value="0.86" | 860 m || 
|-id=199 bgcolor=#FA8072
| 413199 ||  || — || December 19, 2002 || Haleakala || NEAT || — || align=right | 2.5 km || 
|-id=200 bgcolor=#E9E9E9
| 413200 ||  || — || January 10, 2003 || Socorro || LINEAR || — || align=right | 1.7 km || 
|}

413201–413300 

|-bgcolor=#E9E9E9
| 413201 ||  || — || January 10, 2003 || Kitt Peak || Spacewatch || (5) || align=right data-sort-value="0.87" | 870 m || 
|-id=202 bgcolor=#E9E9E9
| 413202 ||  || — || January 11, 2003 || Socorro || LINEAR || — || align=right | 1.5 km || 
|-id=203 bgcolor=#E9E9E9
| 413203 ||  || — || January 13, 2003 || Socorro || LINEAR || — || align=right | 4.5 km || 
|-id=204 bgcolor=#E9E9E9
| 413204 ||  || — || January 11, 2003 || Kitt Peak || Spacewatch || — || align=right | 1.4 km || 
|-id=205 bgcolor=#E9E9E9
| 413205 ||  || — || January 27, 2003 || Palomar || NEAT || (5) || align=right data-sort-value="0.85" | 850 m || 
|-id=206 bgcolor=#E9E9E9
| 413206 ||  || — || January 30, 2003 || Palomar || NEAT || — || align=right | 1.3 km || 
|-id=207 bgcolor=#E9E9E9
| 413207 ||  || — || January 31, 2003 || Kitt Peak || Spacewatch || — || align=right | 1.3 km || 
|-id=208 bgcolor=#E9E9E9
| 413208 ||  || — || January 31, 2003 || Socorro || LINEAR || (5) || align=right | 1.00 km || 
|-id=209 bgcolor=#E9E9E9
| 413209 ||  || — || March 23, 2003 || Kitt Peak || Spacewatch || — || align=right | 1.6 km || 
|-id=210 bgcolor=#E9E9E9
| 413210 ||  || — || March 29, 2003 || Anderson Mesa || LONEOS || — || align=right | 2.7 km || 
|-id=211 bgcolor=#fefefe
| 413211 ||  || — || April 7, 2003 || Socorro || LINEAR || — || align=right data-sort-value="0.95" | 950 m || 
|-id=212 bgcolor=#E9E9E9
| 413212 ||  || — || April 5, 2003 || Anderson Mesa || LONEOS || — || align=right | 1.8 km || 
|-id=213 bgcolor=#fefefe
| 413213 ||  || — || April 8, 2003 || Palomar || NEAT || — || align=right data-sort-value="0.68" | 680 m || 
|-id=214 bgcolor=#E9E9E9
| 413214 ||  || — || April 24, 2003 || Kitt Peak || Spacewatch || — || align=right | 1.6 km || 
|-id=215 bgcolor=#fefefe
| 413215 ||  || — || May 1, 2003 || Kitt Peak || Spacewatch || — || align=right data-sort-value="0.67" | 670 m || 
|-id=216 bgcolor=#FFC2E0
| 413216 ||  || — || June 16, 2003 || Anderson Mesa || LONEOS || AMO || align=right data-sort-value="0.60" | 600 m || 
|-id=217 bgcolor=#fefefe
| 413217 ||  || — || August 2, 2003 || Haleakala || NEAT || — || align=right | 1.7 km || 
|-id=218 bgcolor=#d6d6d6
| 413218 ||  || — || August 22, 2003 || Socorro || LINEAR || — || align=right | 3.4 km || 
|-id=219 bgcolor=#d6d6d6
| 413219 ||  || — || August 24, 2003 || Palomar || NEAT || — || align=right | 3.1 km || 
|-id=220 bgcolor=#d6d6d6
| 413220 ||  || — || August 23, 2003 || Palomar || NEAT || — || align=right | 2.5 km || 
|-id=221 bgcolor=#d6d6d6
| 413221 ||  || — || August 25, 2003 || Palomar || NEAT || — || align=right | 2.9 km || 
|-id=222 bgcolor=#d6d6d6
| 413222 ||  || — || August 30, 2003 || Kitt Peak || Spacewatch || EOS || align=right | 2.1 km || 
|-id=223 bgcolor=#fefefe
| 413223 ||  || — || September 1, 2003 || Socorro || LINEAR || V || align=right data-sort-value="0.60" | 600 m || 
|-id=224 bgcolor=#fefefe
| 413224 ||  || — || August 21, 2003 || Campo Imperatore || CINEOS || — || align=right data-sort-value="0.94" | 940 m || 
|-id=225 bgcolor=#d6d6d6
| 413225 ||  || — || September 2, 2003 || Bergisch Gladbach || W. Bickel || EOS || align=right | 2.2 km || 
|-id=226 bgcolor=#fefefe
| 413226 ||  || — || September 15, 2003 || Anderson Mesa || LONEOS || PHO || align=right | 1.1 km || 
|-id=227 bgcolor=#d6d6d6
| 413227 ||  || — || September 16, 2003 || Kitt Peak || Spacewatch || EUP || align=right | 3.7 km || 
|-id=228 bgcolor=#d6d6d6
| 413228 ||  || — || September 17, 2003 || Kitt Peak || Spacewatch || — || align=right | 2.8 km || 
|-id=229 bgcolor=#fefefe
| 413229 ||  || — || September 17, 2003 || Kitt Peak || Spacewatch || — || align=right data-sort-value="0.86" | 860 m || 
|-id=230 bgcolor=#fefefe
| 413230 ||  || — || September 18, 2003 || Kitt Peak || Spacewatch || — || align=right data-sort-value="0.86" | 860 m || 
|-id=231 bgcolor=#d6d6d6
| 413231 ||  || — || September 18, 2003 || Palomar || NEAT || EOS || align=right | 2.5 km || 
|-id=232 bgcolor=#d6d6d6
| 413232 ||  || — || September 16, 2003 || Kitt Peak || Spacewatch || — || align=right | 2.1 km || 
|-id=233 bgcolor=#fefefe
| 413233 Várkonyiágnes ||  ||  || September 20, 2003 || Piszkéstető || K. Sárneczky, B. Sipőcz || — || align=right data-sort-value="0.70" | 700 m || 
|-id=234 bgcolor=#fefefe
| 413234 ||  || — || September 19, 2003 || Campo Imperatore || CINEOS || — || align=right data-sort-value="0.67" | 670 m || 
|-id=235 bgcolor=#fefefe
| 413235 ||  || — || September 17, 2003 || Socorro || LINEAR || — || align=right data-sort-value="0.97" | 970 m || 
|-id=236 bgcolor=#d6d6d6
| 413236 ||  || — || September 19, 2003 || Anderson Mesa || LONEOS || — || align=right | 3.3 km || 
|-id=237 bgcolor=#fefefe
| 413237 ||  || — || September 22, 2003 || Kitt Peak || Spacewatch || — || align=right data-sort-value="0.84" | 840 m || 
|-id=238 bgcolor=#d6d6d6
| 413238 ||  || — || September 18, 2003 || Palomar || NEAT || — || align=right | 3.1 km || 
|-id=239 bgcolor=#d6d6d6
| 413239 ||  || — || September 21, 2003 || Anderson Mesa || LONEOS || — || align=right | 2.8 km || 
|-id=240 bgcolor=#d6d6d6
| 413240 ||  || — || September 22, 2003 || Kitt Peak || Spacewatch || — || align=right | 2.3 km || 
|-id=241 bgcolor=#d6d6d6
| 413241 ||  || — || September 26, 2003 || Socorro || LINEAR || AEG || align=right | 2.6 km || 
|-id=242 bgcolor=#fefefe
| 413242 ||  || — || September 26, 2003 || Desert Eagle || W. K. Y. Yeung || — || align=right data-sort-value="0.81" | 810 m || 
|-id=243 bgcolor=#d6d6d6
| 413243 ||  || — || September 26, 2003 || Prescott || P. G. Comba || — || align=right | 2.5 km || 
|-id=244 bgcolor=#d6d6d6
| 413244 ||  || — || September 27, 2003 || Kitt Peak || Spacewatch || — || align=right | 2.7 km || 
|-id=245 bgcolor=#d6d6d6
| 413245 ||  || — || September 19, 2003 || Palomar || NEAT || — || align=right | 4.8 km || 
|-id=246 bgcolor=#fefefe
| 413246 ||  || — || September 29, 2003 || Kitt Peak || Spacewatch || V || align=right data-sort-value="0.58" | 580 m || 
|-id=247 bgcolor=#fefefe
| 413247 ||  || — || September 28, 2003 || Socorro || LINEAR || NYS || align=right data-sort-value="0.58" | 580 m || 
|-id=248 bgcolor=#d6d6d6
| 413248 ||  || — || September 16, 2003 || Kitt Peak || Spacewatch || — || align=right | 3.0 km || 
|-id=249 bgcolor=#fefefe
| 413249 ||  || — || September 29, 2003 || Socorro || LINEAR || — || align=right data-sort-value="0.62" | 620 m || 
|-id=250 bgcolor=#d6d6d6
| 413250 ||  || — || September 19, 2003 || Kitt Peak || Spacewatch || — || align=right | 2.5 km || 
|-id=251 bgcolor=#fefefe
| 413251 ||  || — || September 21, 2003 || Kitt Peak || Spacewatch || NYS || align=right data-sort-value="0.52" | 520 m || 
|-id=252 bgcolor=#d6d6d6
| 413252 ||  || — || September 29, 2003 || Anderson Mesa || LONEOS || — || align=right | 5.5 km || 
|-id=253 bgcolor=#fefefe
| 413253 ||  || — || September 18, 2003 || Kitt Peak || Spacewatch || — || align=right data-sort-value="0.78" | 780 m || 
|-id=254 bgcolor=#d6d6d6
| 413254 ||  || — || September 21, 2003 || Anderson Mesa || LONEOS || — || align=right | 3.1 km || 
|-id=255 bgcolor=#fefefe
| 413255 ||  || — || September 18, 2003 || Campo Imperatore || CINEOS || — || align=right data-sort-value="0.94" | 940 m || 
|-id=256 bgcolor=#d6d6d6
| 413256 ||  || — || September 26, 2003 || Apache Point || SDSS || — || align=right | 3.2 km || 
|-id=257 bgcolor=#d6d6d6
| 413257 ||  || — || September 17, 2003 || Kitt Peak || Spacewatch || — || align=right | 3.7 km || 
|-id=258 bgcolor=#d6d6d6
| 413258 ||  || — || September 16, 2003 || Kitt Peak || Spacewatch || — || align=right | 2.3 km || 
|-id=259 bgcolor=#d6d6d6
| 413259 ||  || — || September 30, 2003 || Kitt Peak || Spacewatch || EMA || align=right | 2.8 km || 
|-id=260 bgcolor=#FFC2E0
| 413260 ||  || — || October 13, 2003 || Socorro || LINEAR || ATEPHA || align=right data-sort-value="0.46" | 460 m || 
|-id=261 bgcolor=#d6d6d6
| 413261 ||  || — || October 15, 2003 || Anderson Mesa || LONEOS || — || align=right | 4.0 km || 
|-id=262 bgcolor=#fefefe
| 413262 ||  || — || October 1, 2003 || Anderson Mesa || LONEOS || MAS || align=right data-sort-value="0.66" | 660 m || 
|-id=263 bgcolor=#d6d6d6
| 413263 ||  || — || September 22, 2003 || Anderson Mesa || LONEOS || — || align=right | 3.0 km || 
|-id=264 bgcolor=#d6d6d6
| 413264 ||  || — || October 1, 2003 || Kitt Peak || Spacewatch || — || align=right | 4.1 km || 
|-id=265 bgcolor=#d6d6d6
| 413265 ||  || — || October 1, 2003 || Kitt Peak || Spacewatch || EOS || align=right | 1.8 km || 
|-id=266 bgcolor=#d6d6d6
| 413266 ||  || — || October 2, 2003 || Kitt Peak || Spacewatch || — || align=right | 3.1 km || 
|-id=267 bgcolor=#d6d6d6
| 413267 ||  || — || October 3, 2003 || Kitt Peak || Spacewatch || — || align=right | 3.0 km || 
|-id=268 bgcolor=#d6d6d6
| 413268 ||  || — || September 19, 2003 || Kitt Peak || Spacewatch || EOS || align=right | 1.7 km || 
|-id=269 bgcolor=#d6d6d6
| 413269 ||  || — || October 5, 2003 || Kitt Peak || Spacewatch || EOS || align=right | 1.7 km || 
|-id=270 bgcolor=#fefefe
| 413270 ||  || — || October 16, 2003 || Kitt Peak || Spacewatch || — || align=right data-sort-value="0.87" | 870 m || 
|-id=271 bgcolor=#d6d6d6
| 413271 ||  || — || October 16, 2003 || Kitt Peak || Spacewatch || — || align=right | 3.6 km || 
|-id=272 bgcolor=#fefefe
| 413272 ||  || — || October 20, 2003 || Socorro || LINEAR || — || align=right data-sort-value="0.94" | 940 m || 
|-id=273 bgcolor=#fefefe
| 413273 ||  || — || October 16, 2003 || Palomar || NEAT || — || align=right | 2.7 km || 
|-id=274 bgcolor=#d6d6d6
| 413274 ||  || — || October 16, 2003 || Kitt Peak || Spacewatch || — || align=right | 2.9 km || 
|-id=275 bgcolor=#d6d6d6
| 413275 ||  || — || October 16, 2003 || Kitt Peak || Spacewatch || EOS || align=right | 2.3 km || 
|-id=276 bgcolor=#d6d6d6
| 413276 ||  || — || October 2, 2003 || Kitt Peak || Spacewatch || — || align=right | 3.1 km || 
|-id=277 bgcolor=#d6d6d6
| 413277 ||  || — || October 16, 2003 || Kitt Peak || Spacewatch || — || align=right | 3.5 km || 
|-id=278 bgcolor=#d6d6d6
| 413278 ||  || — || October 16, 2003 || Palomar || NEAT || — || align=right | 3.9 km || 
|-id=279 bgcolor=#fefefe
| 413279 ||  || — || October 18, 2003 || Kitt Peak || Spacewatch || — || align=right data-sort-value="0.64" | 640 m || 
|-id=280 bgcolor=#d6d6d6
| 413280 ||  || — || October 18, 2003 || Kitt Peak || Spacewatch || — || align=right | 5.4 km || 
|-id=281 bgcolor=#fefefe
| 413281 ||  || — || September 28, 2003 || Kitt Peak || Spacewatch || — || align=right data-sort-value="0.65" | 650 m || 
|-id=282 bgcolor=#fefefe
| 413282 ||  || — || October 20, 2003 || Kitt Peak || Spacewatch || — || align=right data-sort-value="0.74" | 740 m || 
|-id=283 bgcolor=#d6d6d6
| 413283 ||  || — || October 19, 2003 || Kitt Peak || Spacewatch || — || align=right | 3.8 km || 
|-id=284 bgcolor=#d6d6d6
| 413284 ||  || — || October 19, 2003 || Kitt Peak || Spacewatch || LIX || align=right | 4.0 km || 
|-id=285 bgcolor=#fefefe
| 413285 ||  || — || October 15, 2003 || Anderson Mesa || LONEOS || — || align=right data-sort-value="0.81" | 810 m || 
|-id=286 bgcolor=#fefefe
| 413286 ||  || — || October 2, 2003 || Kitt Peak || Spacewatch || — || align=right | 1.0 km || 
|-id=287 bgcolor=#fefefe
| 413287 ||  || — || October 21, 2003 || Kitt Peak || Spacewatch || — || align=right data-sort-value="0.87" | 870 m || 
|-id=288 bgcolor=#d6d6d6
| 413288 ||  || — || October 19, 2003 || Palomar || NEAT || — || align=right | 5.2 km || 
|-id=289 bgcolor=#fefefe
| 413289 ||  || — || October 20, 2003 || Kitt Peak || Spacewatch || — || align=right data-sort-value="0.72" | 720 m || 
|-id=290 bgcolor=#d6d6d6
| 413290 ||  || — || October 21, 2003 || Socorro || LINEAR || — || align=right | 2.7 km || 
|-id=291 bgcolor=#d6d6d6
| 413291 ||  || — || September 28, 2003 || Socorro || LINEAR || EOS || align=right | 3.2 km || 
|-id=292 bgcolor=#d6d6d6
| 413292 ||  || — || October 19, 2003 || Kitt Peak || Spacewatch || TIR || align=right | 2.7 km || 
|-id=293 bgcolor=#fefefe
| 413293 ||  || — || October 21, 2003 || Anderson Mesa || LONEOS || MAS || align=right data-sort-value="0.85" | 850 m || 
|-id=294 bgcolor=#fefefe
| 413294 ||  || — || October 21, 2003 || Palomar || NEAT || H || align=right data-sort-value="0.61" | 610 m || 
|-id=295 bgcolor=#d6d6d6
| 413295 ||  || — || October 21, 2003 || Palomar || NEAT || — || align=right | 2.4 km || 
|-id=296 bgcolor=#fefefe
| 413296 ||  || — || October 21, 2003 || Palomar || NEAT || H || align=right data-sort-value="0.78" | 780 m || 
|-id=297 bgcolor=#d6d6d6
| 413297 ||  || — || October 3, 2003 || Kitt Peak || Spacewatch || — || align=right | 3.7 km || 
|-id=298 bgcolor=#fefefe
| 413298 ||  || — || October 20, 2003 || Kitt Peak || Spacewatch || — || align=right data-sort-value="0.79" | 790 m || 
|-id=299 bgcolor=#d6d6d6
| 413299 ||  || — || October 22, 2003 || Socorro || LINEAR || — || align=right | 4.3 km || 
|-id=300 bgcolor=#fefefe
| 413300 ||  || — || October 22, 2003 || Socorro || LINEAR || — || align=right data-sort-value="0.89" | 890 m || 
|}

413301–413400 

|-bgcolor=#d6d6d6
| 413301 ||  || — || October 21, 2003 || Kitt Peak || Spacewatch || — || align=right | 3.5 km || 
|-id=302 bgcolor=#d6d6d6
| 413302 ||  || — || October 22, 2003 || Socorro || LINEAR || — || align=right | 5.8 km || 
|-id=303 bgcolor=#FA8072
| 413303 ||  || — || October 6, 2003 || Socorro || LINEAR || — || align=right | 1.2 km || 
|-id=304 bgcolor=#d6d6d6
| 413304 ||  || — || October 3, 2003 || Kitt Peak || Spacewatch || — || align=right | 3.3 km || 
|-id=305 bgcolor=#fefefe
| 413305 ||  || — || October 23, 2003 || Anderson Mesa || LONEOS || NYS || align=right data-sort-value="0.63" | 630 m || 
|-id=306 bgcolor=#d6d6d6
| 413306 ||  || — || October 24, 2003 || Socorro || LINEAR || — || align=right | 4.9 km || 
|-id=307 bgcolor=#fefefe
| 413307 ||  || — || October 25, 2003 || Socorro || LINEAR || — || align=right data-sort-value="0.69" | 690 m || 
|-id=308 bgcolor=#d6d6d6
| 413308 ||  || — || September 28, 2003 || Kitt Peak || Spacewatch || TIR || align=right | 3.2 km || 
|-id=309 bgcolor=#d6d6d6
| 413309 ||  || — || October 29, 2003 || Catalina || CSS || — || align=right | 3.2 km || 
|-id=310 bgcolor=#fefefe
| 413310 ||  || — || October 19, 2003 || Kitt Peak || Spacewatch || MAS || align=right data-sort-value="0.81" | 810 m || 
|-id=311 bgcolor=#fefefe
| 413311 ||  || — || October 16, 2003 || Kitt Peak || Spacewatch || MAS || align=right data-sort-value="0.56" | 560 m || 
|-id=312 bgcolor=#d6d6d6
| 413312 ||  || — || September 30, 2003 || Kitt Peak || Spacewatch || — || align=right | 2.8 km || 
|-id=313 bgcolor=#d6d6d6
| 413313 ||  || — || October 18, 2003 || Kitt Peak || Spacewatch || EOS || align=right | 2.2 km || 
|-id=314 bgcolor=#fefefe
| 413314 ||  || — || October 18, 2003 || Apache Point || SDSS || — || align=right | 2.4 km || 
|-id=315 bgcolor=#d6d6d6
| 413315 ||  || — || October 19, 2003 || Apache Point || SDSS || — || align=right | 2.7 km || 
|-id=316 bgcolor=#fefefe
| 413316 ||  || — || October 22, 2003 || Apache Point || SDSS || V || align=right data-sort-value="0.62" | 620 m || 
|-id=317 bgcolor=#d6d6d6
| 413317 ||  || — || October 22, 2003 || Apache Point || SDSS || — || align=right | 3.3 km || 
|-id=318 bgcolor=#d6d6d6
| 413318 ||  || — || October 22, 2003 || Apache Point || SDSS || — || align=right | 2.1 km || 
|-id=319 bgcolor=#d6d6d6
| 413319 ||  || — || October 22, 2003 || Apache Point || SDSS || — || align=right | 2.3 km || 
|-id=320 bgcolor=#d6d6d6
| 413320 ||  || — || October 22, 2003 || Kitt Peak || M. W. Buie || — || align=right | 2.7 km || 
|-id=321 bgcolor=#fefefe
| 413321 ||  || — || October 20, 2003 || Kitt Peak || Spacewatch || — || align=right data-sort-value="0.78" | 780 m || 
|-id=322 bgcolor=#fefefe
| 413322 ||  || — || October 24, 2003 || Socorro || LINEAR || — || align=right data-sort-value="0.86" | 860 m || 
|-id=323 bgcolor=#fefefe
| 413323 ||  || — || November 16, 2003 || Kitt Peak || Spacewatch || — || align=right | 1.5 km || 
|-id=324 bgcolor=#d6d6d6
| 413324 ||  || — || November 18, 2003 || Kitt Peak || Spacewatch || — || align=right | 4.1 km || 
|-id=325 bgcolor=#d6d6d6
| 413325 ||  || — || November 20, 2003 || Socorro || LINEAR || — || align=right | 1.9 km || 
|-id=326 bgcolor=#fefefe
| 413326 ||  || — || November 19, 2003 || Kitt Peak || Spacewatch || NYS || align=right data-sort-value="0.63" | 630 m || 
|-id=327 bgcolor=#d6d6d6
| 413327 ||  || — || November 19, 2003 || Kitt Peak || Spacewatch || EUP || align=right | 4.6 km || 
|-id=328 bgcolor=#d6d6d6
| 413328 ||  || — || November 21, 2003 || Socorro || LINEAR || — || align=right | 5.2 km || 
|-id=329 bgcolor=#d6d6d6
| 413329 ||  || — || November 19, 2003 || Anderson Mesa || LONEOS || — || align=right | 3.7 km || 
|-id=330 bgcolor=#d6d6d6
| 413330 ||  || — || November 20, 2003 || Kitt Peak || Spacewatch || — || align=right | 4.5 km || 
|-id=331 bgcolor=#fefefe
| 413331 ||  || — || November 20, 2003 || Socorro || LINEAR || — || align=right | 1.9 km || 
|-id=332 bgcolor=#d6d6d6
| 413332 ||  || — || November 20, 2003 || Socorro || LINEAR || — || align=right | 2.9 km || 
|-id=333 bgcolor=#fefefe
| 413333 ||  || — || November 20, 2003 || Socorro || LINEAR || — || align=right data-sort-value="0.86" | 860 m || 
|-id=334 bgcolor=#d6d6d6
| 413334 ||  || — || November 20, 2003 || Socorro || LINEAR || — || align=right | 5.3 km || 
|-id=335 bgcolor=#d6d6d6
| 413335 ||  || — || November 21, 2003 || Socorro || LINEAR || — || align=right | 3.9 km || 
|-id=336 bgcolor=#fefefe
| 413336 ||  || — || November 21, 2003 || Socorro || LINEAR || — || align=right | 2.0 km || 
|-id=337 bgcolor=#d6d6d6
| 413337 ||  || — || November 24, 2003 || Socorro || LINEAR || — || align=right | 3.0 km || 
|-id=338 bgcolor=#fefefe
| 413338 ||  || — || November 28, 2003 || Kitt Peak || Spacewatch || NYS || align=right data-sort-value="0.71" | 710 m || 
|-id=339 bgcolor=#fefefe
| 413339 ||  || — || November 30, 2003 || Kitt Peak || Spacewatch || — || align=right data-sort-value="0.74" | 740 m || 
|-id=340 bgcolor=#d6d6d6
| 413340 ||  || — || November 30, 2003 || Kitt Peak || Spacewatch || — || align=right | 5.3 km || 
|-id=341 bgcolor=#d6d6d6
| 413341 ||  || — || November 20, 2003 || Kitt Peak || M. W. Buie || — || align=right | 3.0 km || 
|-id=342 bgcolor=#fefefe
| 413342 ||  || — || November 23, 2003 || Kitt Peak || M. W. Buie || NYS || align=right data-sort-value="0.63" | 630 m || 
|-id=343 bgcolor=#FA8072
| 413343 ||  || — || December 3, 2003 || Anderson Mesa || LONEOS || — || align=right | 1.3 km || 
|-id=344 bgcolor=#d6d6d6
| 413344 ||  || — || December 1, 2003 || Kitt Peak || Spacewatch || — || align=right | 4.1 km || 
|-id=345 bgcolor=#d6d6d6
| 413345 ||  || — || December 4, 2003 || Socorro || LINEAR || TIR || align=right | 3.9 km || 
|-id=346 bgcolor=#d6d6d6
| 413346 ||  || — || December 14, 2003 || Kitt Peak || Spacewatch || — || align=right | 4.2 km || 
|-id=347 bgcolor=#d6d6d6
| 413347 ||  || — || November 19, 2003 || Kitt Peak || Spacewatch || THM || align=right | 2.6 km || 
|-id=348 bgcolor=#d6d6d6
| 413348 ||  || — || December 3, 2003 || Socorro || LINEAR || — || align=right | 4.1 km || 
|-id=349 bgcolor=#d6d6d6
| 413349 ||  || — || December 17, 2003 || Socorro || LINEAR || — || align=right | 3.4 km || 
|-id=350 bgcolor=#fefefe
| 413350 ||  || — || December 17, 2003 || Kitt Peak || Spacewatch || H || align=right data-sort-value="0.90" | 900 m || 
|-id=351 bgcolor=#d6d6d6
| 413351 ||  || — || December 17, 2003 || Socorro || LINEAR || — || align=right | 2.3 km || 
|-id=352 bgcolor=#d6d6d6
| 413352 ||  || — || December 18, 2003 || Socorro || LINEAR || EUP || align=right | 4.4 km || 
|-id=353 bgcolor=#fefefe
| 413353 ||  || — || December 18, 2003 || Socorro || LINEAR || — || align=right data-sort-value="0.87" | 870 m || 
|-id=354 bgcolor=#fefefe
| 413354 ||  || — || December 19, 2003 || Socorro || LINEAR || — || align=right data-sort-value="0.88" | 880 m || 
|-id=355 bgcolor=#fefefe
| 413355 ||  || — || November 19, 2003 || Kitt Peak || Spacewatch || MAS || align=right data-sort-value="0.50" | 500 m || 
|-id=356 bgcolor=#fefefe
| 413356 ||  || — || December 19, 2003 || Kitt Peak || Spacewatch || MAS || align=right data-sort-value="0.68" | 680 m || 
|-id=357 bgcolor=#fefefe
| 413357 ||  || — || December 18, 2003 || Socorro || LINEAR || — || align=right | 1.1 km || 
|-id=358 bgcolor=#d6d6d6
| 413358 ||  || — || December 21, 2003 || Socorro || LINEAR || — || align=right | 3.0 km || 
|-id=359 bgcolor=#d6d6d6
| 413359 ||  || — || December 27, 2003 || Socorro || LINEAR || — || align=right | 4.8 km || 
|-id=360 bgcolor=#d6d6d6
| 413360 ||  || — || December 29, 2003 || Socorro || LINEAR || THB || align=right | 3.4 km || 
|-id=361 bgcolor=#d6d6d6
| 413361 ||  || — || January 16, 2004 || Palomar || NEAT || — || align=right | 3.9 km || 
|-id=362 bgcolor=#fefefe
| 413362 ||  || — || January 16, 2004 || Kitt Peak || Spacewatch || — || align=right data-sort-value="0.76" | 760 m || 
|-id=363 bgcolor=#d6d6d6
| 413363 ||  || — || January 16, 2004 || Kitt Peak || Spacewatch || EOS || align=right | 2.6 km || 
|-id=364 bgcolor=#fefefe
| 413364 ||  || — || January 19, 2004 || Kitt Peak || Spacewatch || MAS || align=right data-sort-value="0.58" | 580 m || 
|-id=365 bgcolor=#d6d6d6
| 413365 ||  || — || January 27, 2004 || Goodricke-Pigott || R. A. Tucker || — || align=right | 2.7 km || 
|-id=366 bgcolor=#d6d6d6
| 413366 ||  || — || January 28, 2004 || Socorro || LINEAR || — || align=right | 2.9 km || 
|-id=367 bgcolor=#fefefe
| 413367 ||  || — || December 18, 2003 || Kitt Peak || Spacewatch || — || align=right data-sort-value="0.67" | 670 m || 
|-id=368 bgcolor=#E9E9E9
| 413368 ||  || — || February 13, 2004 || Kitt Peak || Spacewatch || — || align=right | 1.8 km || 
|-id=369 bgcolor=#E9E9E9
| 413369 ||  || — || March 27, 2004 || Socorro || LINEAR || EUN || align=right | 1.2 km || 
|-id=370 bgcolor=#E9E9E9
| 413370 ||  || — || April 13, 2004 || Mount Graham || W. H. Ryan, Q. Jamieson || — || align=right | 1.6 km || 
|-id=371 bgcolor=#E9E9E9
| 413371 ||  || — || April 15, 2004 || Siding Spring || SSS || EUN || align=right | 1.7 km || 
|-id=372 bgcolor=#E9E9E9
| 413372 ||  || — || April 15, 2004 || Siding Spring || SSS || — || align=right | 1.9 km || 
|-id=373 bgcolor=#E9E9E9
| 413373 ||  || — || April 13, 2004 || Kitt Peak || Spacewatch || — || align=right data-sort-value="0.91" | 910 m || 
|-id=374 bgcolor=#E9E9E9
| 413374 ||  || — || April 9, 2004 || Siding Spring || SSS || RAF || align=right data-sort-value="0.95" | 950 m || 
|-id=375 bgcolor=#E9E9E9
| 413375 ||  || — || April 16, 2004 || Socorro || LINEAR || — || align=right | 2.0 km || 
|-id=376 bgcolor=#E9E9E9
| 413376 ||  || — || April 17, 2004 || Socorro || LINEAR || — || align=right | 1.9 km || 
|-id=377 bgcolor=#E9E9E9
| 413377 ||  || — || March 23, 2004 || Kitt Peak || Spacewatch || EUN || align=right | 1.1 km || 
|-id=378 bgcolor=#E9E9E9
| 413378 ||  || — || April 21, 2004 || Socorro || LINEAR || — || align=right | 4.2 km || 
|-id=379 bgcolor=#E9E9E9
| 413379 ||  || — || April 21, 2004 || Socorro || LINEAR || — || align=right | 1.6 km || 
|-id=380 bgcolor=#E9E9E9
| 413380 ||  || — || May 9, 2004 || Palomar || NEAT || — || align=right | 2.0 km || 
|-id=381 bgcolor=#E9E9E9
| 413381 ||  || — || May 15, 2004 || Socorro || LINEAR || JUN || align=right | 1.1 km || 
|-id=382 bgcolor=#E9E9E9
| 413382 ||  || — || May 15, 2004 || Socorro || LINEAR || — || align=right | 2.8 km || 
|-id=383 bgcolor=#fefefe
| 413383 ||  || — || July 11, 2004 || Socorro || LINEAR || — || align=right | 1.5 km || 
|-id=384 bgcolor=#fefefe
| 413384 ||  || — || August 7, 2004 || Palomar || NEAT || — || align=right data-sort-value="0.64" | 640 m || 
|-id=385 bgcolor=#d6d6d6
| 413385 ||  || — || August 10, 2004 || Socorro || LINEAR || — || align=right | 3.2 km || 
|-id=386 bgcolor=#FA8072
| 413386 ||  || — || August 15, 2004 || Cerro Tololo || M. W. Buie || — || align=right data-sort-value="0.65" | 650 m || 
|-id=387 bgcolor=#fefefe
| 413387 ||  || — || August 21, 2004 || Catalina || CSS || — || align=right | 1.3 km || 
|-id=388 bgcolor=#fefefe
| 413388 ||  || — || September 8, 2004 || Socorro || LINEAR || — || align=right data-sort-value="0.81" | 810 m || 
|-id=389 bgcolor=#d6d6d6
| 413389 ||  || — || September 9, 2004 || Socorro || LINEAR || — || align=right | 2.9 km || 
|-id=390 bgcolor=#FA8072
| 413390 ||  || — || September 8, 2004 || Socorro || LINEAR || — || align=right data-sort-value="0.66" | 660 m || 
|-id=391 bgcolor=#fefefe
| 413391 ||  || — || September 10, 2004 || Socorro || LINEAR || — || align=right data-sort-value="0.79" | 790 m || 
|-id=392 bgcolor=#d6d6d6
| 413392 ||  || — || September 10, 2004 || Socorro || LINEAR || — || align=right | 2.5 km || 
|-id=393 bgcolor=#fefefe
| 413393 ||  || — || September 10, 2004 || Kitt Peak || Spacewatch || — || align=right data-sort-value="0.68" | 680 m || 
|-id=394 bgcolor=#fefefe
| 413394 ||  || — || August 21, 2004 || Catalina || CSS || — || align=right data-sort-value="0.81" | 810 m || 
|-id=395 bgcolor=#d6d6d6
| 413395 ||  || — || September 11, 2004 || Socorro || LINEAR || — || align=right | 3.0 km || 
|-id=396 bgcolor=#fefefe
| 413396 ||  || — || September 9, 2004 || Socorro || LINEAR || — || align=right data-sort-value="0.79" | 790 m || 
|-id=397 bgcolor=#fefefe
| 413397 ||  || — || September 10, 2004 || Socorro || LINEAR || — || align=right data-sort-value="0.61" | 610 m || 
|-id=398 bgcolor=#fefefe
| 413398 ||  || — || September 12, 2004 || Kitt Peak || Spacewatch || — || align=right data-sort-value="0.77" | 770 m || 
|-id=399 bgcolor=#d6d6d6
| 413399 ||  || — || September 13, 2004 || Socorro || LINEAR || — || align=right | 2.8 km || 
|-id=400 bgcolor=#fefefe
| 413400 ||  || — || September 13, 2004 || Palomar || NEAT || — || align=right data-sort-value="0.72" | 720 m || 
|}

413401–413500 

|-bgcolor=#fefefe
| 413401 ||  || — || September 13, 2004 || Socorro || LINEAR || — || align=right data-sort-value="0.69" | 690 m || 
|-id=402 bgcolor=#fefefe
| 413402 ||  || — || September 13, 2004 || Anderson Mesa || LONEOS || — || align=right data-sort-value="0.82" | 820 m || 
|-id=403 bgcolor=#fefefe
| 413403 ||  || — || October 4, 2004 || Kitt Peak || Spacewatch || — || align=right data-sort-value="0.61" | 610 m || 
|-id=404 bgcolor=#d6d6d6
| 413404 ||  || — || October 4, 2004 || Kitt Peak || Spacewatch || NAE || align=right | 2.4 km || 
|-id=405 bgcolor=#fefefe
| 413405 ||  || — || October 4, 2004 || Kitt Peak || Spacewatch || — || align=right data-sort-value="0.71" | 710 m || 
|-id=406 bgcolor=#fefefe
| 413406 ||  || — || October 5, 2004 || Kitt Peak || Spacewatch || — || align=right data-sort-value="0.77" | 770 m || 
|-id=407 bgcolor=#fefefe
| 413407 ||  || — || September 7, 2004 || Kitt Peak || Spacewatch || — || align=right data-sort-value="0.72" | 720 m || 
|-id=408 bgcolor=#d6d6d6
| 413408 ||  || — || October 9, 2004 || Anderson Mesa || LONEOS || — || align=right | 3.7 km || 
|-id=409 bgcolor=#d6d6d6
| 413409 ||  || — || October 6, 2004 || Kitt Peak || Spacewatch || KOR || align=right | 1.3 km || 
|-id=410 bgcolor=#d6d6d6
| 413410 ||  || — || October 6, 2004 || Kitt Peak || Spacewatch || KOR || align=right | 1.3 km || 
|-id=411 bgcolor=#fefefe
| 413411 ||  || — || October 9, 2004 || Socorro || LINEAR || — || align=right data-sort-value="0.79" | 790 m || 
|-id=412 bgcolor=#fefefe
| 413412 ||  || — || October 4, 2004 || Kitt Peak || Spacewatch || — || align=right data-sort-value="0.46" | 460 m || 
|-id=413 bgcolor=#d6d6d6
| 413413 ||  || — || September 10, 2004 || Kitt Peak || Spacewatch || EOS || align=right | 1.7 km || 
|-id=414 bgcolor=#fefefe
| 413414 ||  || — || October 7, 2004 || Kitt Peak || Spacewatch || — || align=right data-sort-value="0.75" | 750 m || 
|-id=415 bgcolor=#d6d6d6
| 413415 ||  || — || October 8, 2004 || Kitt Peak || Spacewatch || — || align=right | 2.4 km || 
|-id=416 bgcolor=#fefefe
| 413416 ||  || — || October 5, 2004 || Kitt Peak || Spacewatch || — || align=right data-sort-value="0.60" | 600 m || 
|-id=417 bgcolor=#fefefe
| 413417 ||  || — || October 8, 2004 || Socorro || LINEAR || H || align=right data-sort-value="0.81" | 810 m || 
|-id=418 bgcolor=#d6d6d6
| 413418 ||  || — || October 6, 2004 || Kitt Peak || Spacewatch || — || align=right | 2.6 km || 
|-id=419 bgcolor=#d6d6d6
| 413419 ||  || — || October 9, 2004 || Kitt Peak || Spacewatch || — || align=right | 2.8 km || 
|-id=420 bgcolor=#fefefe
| 413420 ||  || — || October 9, 2004 || Kitt Peak || Spacewatch || — || align=right data-sort-value="0.76" | 760 m || 
|-id=421 bgcolor=#FFC2E0
| 413421 ||  || — || November 5, 2004 || Anderson Mesa || LONEOS || AMO +1km || align=right | 1.9 km || 
|-id=422 bgcolor=#fefefe
| 413422 ||  || — || November 4, 2004 || Kitt Peak || Spacewatch || — || align=right data-sort-value="0.72" | 720 m || 
|-id=423 bgcolor=#d6d6d6
| 413423 ||  || — || November 4, 2004 || Kitt Peak || Spacewatch || — || align=right | 2.9 km || 
|-id=424 bgcolor=#fefefe
| 413424 ||  || — || November 4, 2004 || Catalina || CSS || — || align=right data-sort-value="0.81" | 810 m || 
|-id=425 bgcolor=#d6d6d6
| 413425 ||  || — || December 8, 2004 || Socorro || LINEAR || — || align=right | 2.8 km || 
|-id=426 bgcolor=#fefefe
| 413426 ||  || — || November 4, 2004 || Kitt Peak || Spacewatch || — || align=right data-sort-value="0.87" | 870 m || 
|-id=427 bgcolor=#d6d6d6
| 413427 ||  || — || December 10, 2004 || Socorro || LINEAR || — || align=right | 3.8 km || 
|-id=428 bgcolor=#d6d6d6
| 413428 ||  || — || December 14, 2004 || Socorro || LINEAR || — || align=right | 3.6 km || 
|-id=429 bgcolor=#fefefe
| 413429 ||  || — || December 12, 2004 || Socorro || LINEAR || — || align=right data-sort-value="0.79" | 790 m || 
|-id=430 bgcolor=#d6d6d6
| 413430 ||  || — || December 14, 2004 || Kitt Peak || Spacewatch || — || align=right | 1.9 km || 
|-id=431 bgcolor=#d6d6d6
| 413431 ||  || — || December 18, 2004 || Mount Lemmon || Mount Lemmon Survey || HYG || align=right | 2.7 km || 
|-id=432 bgcolor=#d6d6d6
| 413432 ||  || — || December 18, 2004 || Mount Lemmon || Mount Lemmon Survey || — || align=right | 3.1 km || 
|-id=433 bgcolor=#d6d6d6
| 413433 ||  || — || December 18, 2004 || Mount Lemmon || Mount Lemmon Survey || — || align=right | 4.3 km || 
|-id=434 bgcolor=#d6d6d6
| 413434 ||  || — || January 7, 2005 || Catalina || CSS || — || align=right | 4.0 km || 
|-id=435 bgcolor=#d6d6d6
| 413435 ||  || — || January 13, 2005 || Socorro || LINEAR || — || align=right | 2.7 km || 
|-id=436 bgcolor=#d6d6d6
| 413436 ||  || — || January 6, 2005 || Catalina || CSS || — || align=right | 3.4 km || 
|-id=437 bgcolor=#fefefe
| 413437 ||  || — || January 15, 2005 || Kitt Peak || Spacewatch || NYS || align=right data-sort-value="0.86" | 860 m || 
|-id=438 bgcolor=#fefefe
| 413438 ||  || — || January 16, 2005 || Desert Eagle || W. K. Y. Yeung || — || align=right data-sort-value="0.56" | 560 m || 
|-id=439 bgcolor=#fefefe
| 413439 ||  || — || January 16, 2005 || Socorro || LINEAR || — || align=right data-sort-value="0.80" | 800 m || 
|-id=440 bgcolor=#fefefe
| 413440 ||  || — || December 15, 2004 || Kitt Peak || Spacewatch || — || align=right data-sort-value="0.77" | 770 m || 
|-id=441 bgcolor=#fefefe
| 413441 ||  || — || January 17, 2005 || Socorro || LINEAR || — || align=right data-sort-value="0.84" | 840 m || 
|-id=442 bgcolor=#d6d6d6
| 413442 ||  || — || February 1, 2005 || Palomar || NEAT || THB || align=right | 3.6 km || 
|-id=443 bgcolor=#d6d6d6
| 413443 ||  || — || February 1, 2005 || Kitt Peak || Spacewatch || LIX || align=right | 4.9 km || 
|-id=444 bgcolor=#d6d6d6
| 413444 ||  || — || February 1, 2005 || Kitt Peak || Spacewatch || — || align=right | 3.1 km || 
|-id=445 bgcolor=#fefefe
| 413445 ||  || — || February 2, 2005 || Kitt Peak || Spacewatch || V || align=right data-sort-value="0.70" | 700 m || 
|-id=446 bgcolor=#d6d6d6
| 413446 ||  || — || February 2, 2005 || Kitt Peak || Spacewatch || — || align=right | 3.3 km || 
|-id=447 bgcolor=#fefefe
| 413447 ||  || — || January 19, 2005 || Kitt Peak || Spacewatch || V || align=right data-sort-value="0.86" | 860 m || 
|-id=448 bgcolor=#d6d6d6
| 413448 ||  || — || February 4, 2005 || Mount Lemmon || Mount Lemmon Survey || THM || align=right | 2.1 km || 
|-id=449 bgcolor=#fefefe
| 413449 ||  || — || January 13, 2005 || Kitt Peak || Spacewatch || — || align=right data-sort-value="0.66" | 660 m || 
|-id=450 bgcolor=#fefefe
| 413450 ||  || — || March 1, 2005 || Kitt Peak || Spacewatch || — || align=right data-sort-value="0.68" | 680 m || 
|-id=451 bgcolor=#fefefe
| 413451 ||  || — || March 3, 2005 || Socorro || LINEAR || — || align=right | 3.1 km || 
|-id=452 bgcolor=#fefefe
| 413452 ||  || — || March 3, 2005 || Catalina || CSS || — || align=right | 1.1 km || 
|-id=453 bgcolor=#fefefe
| 413453 ||  || — || March 4, 2005 || Mount Lemmon || Mount Lemmon Survey || — || align=right | 1.1 km || 
|-id=454 bgcolor=#d6d6d6
| 413454 ||  || — || March 4, 2005 || Mount Lemmon || Mount Lemmon Survey || — || align=right | 2.7 km || 
|-id=455 bgcolor=#fefefe
| 413455 ||  || — || March 10, 2005 || Mount Lemmon || Mount Lemmon Survey || — || align=right data-sort-value="0.99" | 990 m || 
|-id=456 bgcolor=#fefefe
| 413456 ||  || — || March 10, 2005 || Kitt Peak || Spacewatch || H || align=right data-sort-value="0.69" | 690 m || 
|-id=457 bgcolor=#fefefe
| 413457 ||  || — || March 8, 2005 || Catalina || CSS || H || align=right | 1.0 km || 
|-id=458 bgcolor=#fefefe
| 413458 ||  || — || March 9, 2005 || Mount Lemmon || Mount Lemmon Survey || — || align=right data-sort-value="0.94" | 940 m || 
|-id=459 bgcolor=#fefefe
| 413459 ||  || — || March 11, 2005 || Catalina || CSS || — || align=right | 1.1 km || 
|-id=460 bgcolor=#d6d6d6
| 413460 ||  || — || March 11, 2005 || Mount Lemmon || Mount Lemmon Survey || — || align=right | 2.9 km || 
|-id=461 bgcolor=#d6d6d6
| 413461 ||  || — || March 8, 2005 || Catalina || CSS || — || align=right | 4.7 km || 
|-id=462 bgcolor=#d6d6d6
| 413462 ||  || — || March 4, 2005 || Socorro || LINEAR || Tj (2.98) || align=right | 4.4 km || 
|-id=463 bgcolor=#fefefe
| 413463 ||  || — || December 29, 2000 || Kitt Peak || Spacewatch || NYS || align=right data-sort-value="0.65" | 650 m || 
|-id=464 bgcolor=#fefefe
| 413464 ||  || — || March 11, 2005 || Kitt Peak || Spacewatch || — || align=right data-sort-value="0.68" | 680 m || 
|-id=465 bgcolor=#d6d6d6
| 413465 ||  || — || February 9, 2005 || Kitt Peak || Spacewatch || THM || align=right | 2.3 km || 
|-id=466 bgcolor=#d6d6d6
| 413466 ||  || — || March 10, 2005 || Kitt Peak || M. W. Buie || — || align=right | 3.6 km || 
|-id=467 bgcolor=#fefefe
| 413467 ||  || — || April 4, 2005 || Catalina || CSS || — || align=right | 1.0 km || 
|-id=468 bgcolor=#fefefe
| 413468 ||  || — || March 8, 2005 || Mount Lemmon || Mount Lemmon Survey || NYS || align=right data-sort-value="0.57" | 570 m || 
|-id=469 bgcolor=#fefefe
| 413469 ||  || — || April 5, 2005 || Mount Lemmon || Mount Lemmon Survey || H || align=right data-sort-value="0.62" | 620 m || 
|-id=470 bgcolor=#fefefe
| 413470 ||  || — || February 27, 2001 || Kitt Peak || Spacewatch || NYS || align=right data-sort-value="0.67" | 670 m || 
|-id=471 bgcolor=#fefefe
| 413471 ||  || — || April 1, 2005 || Kitt Peak || Spacewatch || — || align=right data-sort-value="0.69" | 690 m || 
|-id=472 bgcolor=#fefefe
| 413472 ||  || — || April 1, 2005 || Kitt Peak || Spacewatch || — || align=right data-sort-value="0.79" | 790 m || 
|-id=473 bgcolor=#fefefe
| 413473 ||  || — || March 16, 2005 || Mount Lemmon || Mount Lemmon Survey || — || align=right data-sort-value="0.79" | 790 m || 
|-id=474 bgcolor=#fefefe
| 413474 ||  || — || April 11, 2005 || Kitt Peak || Spacewatch || V || align=right data-sort-value="0.64" | 640 m || 
|-id=475 bgcolor=#fefefe
| 413475 ||  || — || April 13, 2005 || Catalina || CSS || V || align=right data-sort-value="0.84" | 840 m || 
|-id=476 bgcolor=#fefefe
| 413476 ||  || — || April 12, 2005 || Kitt Peak || Spacewatch || MAS || align=right data-sort-value="0.73" | 730 m || 
|-id=477 bgcolor=#fefefe
| 413477 ||  || — || April 1, 2005 || Kitt Peak || Spacewatch || — || align=right data-sort-value="0.89" | 890 m || 
|-id=478 bgcolor=#fefefe
| 413478 ||  || — || May 3, 2005 || Kitt Peak || Spacewatch || — || align=right | 1.0 km || 
|-id=479 bgcolor=#E9E9E9
| 413479 ||  || — || May 7, 2005 || Mount Lemmon || Mount Lemmon Survey || — || align=right | 2.2 km || 
|-id=480 bgcolor=#fefefe
| 413480 ||  || — || May 3, 2005 || Kitt Peak || Spacewatch || — || align=right | 1.2 km || 
|-id=481 bgcolor=#fefefe
| 413481 ||  || — || March 18, 2005 || Socorro || LINEAR || H || align=right data-sort-value="0.54" | 540 m || 
|-id=482 bgcolor=#fefefe
| 413482 ||  || — || May 12, 2005 || Catalina || CSS || — || align=right data-sort-value="0.98" | 980 m || 
|-id=483 bgcolor=#fefefe
| 413483 ||  || — || May 4, 2005 || Mount Lemmon || Mount Lemmon Survey || NYS || align=right data-sort-value="0.61" | 610 m || 
|-id=484 bgcolor=#E9E9E9
| 413484 ||  || — || June 9, 2005 || Kitt Peak || Spacewatch || — || align=right | 1.6 km || 
|-id=485 bgcolor=#d6d6d6
| 413485 ||  || — || June 29, 2005 || Kitt Peak || Spacewatch || 3:2 || align=right | 3.3 km || 
|-id=486 bgcolor=#E9E9E9
| 413486 ||  || — || June 30, 2005 || Kitt Peak || Spacewatch || — || align=right | 1.6 km || 
|-id=487 bgcolor=#E9E9E9
| 413487 ||  || — || July 3, 2005 || Mount Lemmon || Mount Lemmon Survey || — || align=right data-sort-value="0.92" | 920 m || 
|-id=488 bgcolor=#E9E9E9
| 413488 ||  || — || June 13, 2005 || Kitt Peak || Spacewatch || — || align=right | 1.2 km || 
|-id=489 bgcolor=#E9E9E9
| 413489 ||  || — || July 3, 2005 || Mount Lemmon || Mount Lemmon Survey || — || align=right | 1.4 km || 
|-id=490 bgcolor=#d6d6d6
| 413490 ||  || — || July 3, 2005 || Mount Lemmon || Mount Lemmon Survey || 3:2 || align=right | 4.0 km || 
|-id=491 bgcolor=#E9E9E9
| 413491 ||  || — || July 4, 2005 || Palomar || NEAT || EUN || align=right | 1.2 km || 
|-id=492 bgcolor=#E9E9E9
| 413492 ||  || — || July 30, 2005 || Palomar || NEAT || — || align=right | 2.2 km || 
|-id=493 bgcolor=#E9E9E9
| 413493 ||  || — || July 29, 2005 || Palomar || NEAT || — || align=right | 1.6 km || 
|-id=494 bgcolor=#E9E9E9
| 413494 ||  || — || August 4, 2005 || Palomar || NEAT || — || align=right | 1.6 km || 
|-id=495 bgcolor=#E9E9E9
| 413495 ||  || — || August 24, 2005 || Palomar || NEAT || — || align=right | 1.8 km || 
|-id=496 bgcolor=#E9E9E9
| 413496 ||  || — || August 6, 2005 || Socorro || LINEAR || JUN || align=right | 1.2 km || 
|-id=497 bgcolor=#E9E9E9
| 413497 ||  || — || August 24, 2005 || Palomar || NEAT || — || align=right | 1.6 km || 
|-id=498 bgcolor=#E9E9E9
| 413498 ||  || — || August 25, 2005 || Palomar || NEAT || — || align=right | 1.3 km || 
|-id=499 bgcolor=#E9E9E9
| 413499 ||  || — || August 25, 2005 || Palomar || NEAT || — || align=right | 1.6 km || 
|-id=500 bgcolor=#E9E9E9
| 413500 ||  || — || August 25, 2005 || Campo Imperatore || CINEOS || — || align=right | 1.4 km || 
|}

413501–413600 

|-bgcolor=#E9E9E9
| 413501 ||  || — || August 26, 2005 || Palomar || NEAT || — || align=right | 1.9 km || 
|-id=502 bgcolor=#E9E9E9
| 413502 ||  || — || August 29, 2005 || Kitt Peak || Spacewatch || EUN || align=right | 1.6 km || 
|-id=503 bgcolor=#E9E9E9
| 413503 ||  || — || August 30, 2005 || Campo Imperatore || CINEOS || — || align=right | 1.8 km || 
|-id=504 bgcolor=#E9E9E9
| 413504 ||  || — || August 28, 2005 || Kitt Peak || Spacewatch || — || align=right | 1.3 km || 
|-id=505 bgcolor=#E9E9E9
| 413505 ||  || — || August 28, 2005 || Kitt Peak || Spacewatch || — || align=right | 1.5 km || 
|-id=506 bgcolor=#E9E9E9
| 413506 ||  || — || August 28, 2005 || Kitt Peak || Spacewatch || WIT || align=right data-sort-value="0.91" | 910 m || 
|-id=507 bgcolor=#E9E9E9
| 413507 ||  || — || August 28, 2005 || Kitt Peak || Spacewatch || — || align=right | 1.9 km || 
|-id=508 bgcolor=#E9E9E9
| 413508 ||  || — || August 28, 2005 || Kitt Peak || Spacewatch || — || align=right | 1.7 km || 
|-id=509 bgcolor=#E9E9E9
| 413509 ||  || — || August 31, 2005 || Kitt Peak || Spacewatch || — || align=right | 1.3 km || 
|-id=510 bgcolor=#E9E9E9
| 413510 ||  || — || August 29, 2005 || Kitt Peak || Spacewatch || — || align=right | 2.3 km || 
|-id=511 bgcolor=#E9E9E9
| 413511 ||  || — || September 11, 2005 || Socorro || LINEAR || — || align=right | 2.2 km || 
|-id=512 bgcolor=#E9E9E9
| 413512 ||  || — || September 2, 2005 || Palomar || NEAT || — || align=right | 4.4 km || 
|-id=513 bgcolor=#E9E9E9
| 413513 ||  || — || September 13, 2005 || Apache Point || A. C. Becker || — || align=right | 1.3 km || 
|-id=514 bgcolor=#E9E9E9
| 413514 ||  || — || September 13, 2005 || Apache Point || A. C. Becker || — || align=right | 1.9 km || 
|-id=515 bgcolor=#E9E9E9
| 413515 ||  || — || September 23, 2005 || Kitt Peak || Spacewatch || — || align=right | 2.6 km || 
|-id=516 bgcolor=#E9E9E9
| 413516 ||  || — || September 26, 2005 || Kitt Peak || Spacewatch || fast? || align=right | 1.4 km || 
|-id=517 bgcolor=#E9E9E9
| 413517 ||  || — || September 13, 2005 || Catalina || CSS || — || align=right | 1.5 km || 
|-id=518 bgcolor=#E9E9E9
| 413518 ||  || — || September 23, 2005 || Kitt Peak || Spacewatch || — || align=right | 2.1 km || 
|-id=519 bgcolor=#E9E9E9
| 413519 ||  || — || September 9, 2005 || Socorro || LINEAR || — || align=right | 2.2 km || 
|-id=520 bgcolor=#E9E9E9
| 413520 ||  || — || September 23, 2005 || Kitt Peak || Spacewatch || — || align=right | 2.2 km || 
|-id=521 bgcolor=#E9E9E9
| 413521 ||  || — || September 24, 2005 || Kitt Peak || Spacewatch || MIS || align=right | 2.3 km || 
|-id=522 bgcolor=#E9E9E9
| 413522 ||  || — || September 24, 2005 || Kitt Peak || Spacewatch || — || align=right | 1.3 km || 
|-id=523 bgcolor=#E9E9E9
| 413523 ||  || — || September 24, 2005 || Kitt Peak || Spacewatch || — || align=right | 1.5 km || 
|-id=524 bgcolor=#E9E9E9
| 413524 ||  || — || September 24, 2005 || Kitt Peak || Spacewatch || — || align=right | 1.7 km || 
|-id=525 bgcolor=#E9E9E9
| 413525 ||  || — || September 25, 2005 || Kitt Peak || Spacewatch || WIT || align=right | 1.0 km || 
|-id=526 bgcolor=#E9E9E9
| 413526 ||  || — || September 26, 2005 || Kitt Peak || Spacewatch || — || align=right | 1.5 km || 
|-id=527 bgcolor=#E9E9E9
| 413527 ||  || — || September 26, 2005 || Kitt Peak || Spacewatch || — || align=right | 1.9 km || 
|-id=528 bgcolor=#E9E9E9
| 413528 ||  || — || September 24, 2005 || Kitt Peak || Spacewatch || — || align=right | 1.7 km || 
|-id=529 bgcolor=#E9E9E9
| 413529 ||  || — || September 24, 2005 || Kitt Peak || Spacewatch || — || align=right | 1.9 km || 
|-id=530 bgcolor=#E9E9E9
| 413530 ||  || — || September 24, 2005 || Kitt Peak || Spacewatch || — || align=right | 1.8 km || 
|-id=531 bgcolor=#E9E9E9
| 413531 ||  || — || September 24, 2005 || Kitt Peak || Spacewatch || — || align=right | 2.3 km || 
|-id=532 bgcolor=#E9E9E9
| 413532 ||  || — || September 24, 2005 || Kitt Peak || Spacewatch || — || align=right | 2.1 km || 
|-id=533 bgcolor=#E9E9E9
| 413533 ||  || — || September 25, 2005 || Kitt Peak || Spacewatch || — || align=right | 2.0 km || 
|-id=534 bgcolor=#E9E9E9
| 413534 ||  || — || September 25, 2005 || Kitt Peak || Spacewatch || — || align=right | 2.6 km || 
|-id=535 bgcolor=#E9E9E9
| 413535 ||  || — || September 26, 2005 || Kitt Peak || Spacewatch || — || align=right | 1.9 km || 
|-id=536 bgcolor=#E9E9E9
| 413536 ||  || — || September 29, 2005 || Kitt Peak || Spacewatch || — || align=right | 1.9 km || 
|-id=537 bgcolor=#E9E9E9
| 413537 ||  || — || September 29, 2005 || Mount Lemmon || Mount Lemmon Survey || AGN || align=right data-sort-value="0.93" | 930 m || 
|-id=538 bgcolor=#E9E9E9
| 413538 ||  || — || September 29, 2005 || Kitt Peak || Spacewatch || — || align=right | 1.5 km || 
|-id=539 bgcolor=#E9E9E9
| 413539 ||  || — || September 29, 2005 || Kitt Peak || Spacewatch || — || align=right | 1.6 km || 
|-id=540 bgcolor=#E9E9E9
| 413540 ||  || — || September 25, 2005 || Kitt Peak || Spacewatch || — || align=right | 1.4 km || 
|-id=541 bgcolor=#E9E9E9
| 413541 ||  || — || September 25, 2005 || Kitt Peak || Spacewatch || WIT || align=right data-sort-value="0.95" | 950 m || 
|-id=542 bgcolor=#E9E9E9
| 413542 ||  || — || September 23, 2005 || Catalina || CSS || — || align=right | 2.3 km || 
|-id=543 bgcolor=#E9E9E9
| 413543 ||  || — || September 27, 2005 || Kitt Peak || Spacewatch || — || align=right | 1.8 km || 
|-id=544 bgcolor=#E9E9E9
| 413544 ||  || — || September 29, 2005 || Kitt Peak || Spacewatch || — || align=right | 1.4 km || 
|-id=545 bgcolor=#E9E9E9
| 413545 ||  || — || September 29, 2005 || Kitt Peak || Spacewatch || — || align=right | 1.7 km || 
|-id=546 bgcolor=#E9E9E9
| 413546 ||  || — || September 29, 2005 || Kitt Peak || Spacewatch || — || align=right | 2.1 km || 
|-id=547 bgcolor=#E9E9E9
| 413547 ||  || — || September 29, 2005 || Anderson Mesa || LONEOS || EUN || align=right | 1.2 km || 
|-id=548 bgcolor=#E9E9E9
| 413548 ||  || — || September 1, 2005 || Kitt Peak || Spacewatch || — || align=right | 1.8 km || 
|-id=549 bgcolor=#E9E9E9
| 413549 ||  || — || September 29, 2005 || Kitt Peak || Spacewatch || — || align=right | 1.8 km || 
|-id=550 bgcolor=#E9E9E9
| 413550 ||  || — || September 29, 2005 || Mount Lemmon || Mount Lemmon Survey || — || align=right | 2.3 km || 
|-id=551 bgcolor=#E9E9E9
| 413551 ||  || — || September 30, 2005 || Mount Lemmon || Mount Lemmon Survey || — || align=right | 1.4 km || 
|-id=552 bgcolor=#E9E9E9
| 413552 ||  || — || September 30, 2005 || Mount Lemmon || Mount Lemmon Survey ||  || align=right | 2.4 km || 
|-id=553 bgcolor=#E9E9E9
| 413553 ||  || — || September 30, 2005 || Catalina || CSS || — || align=right | 3.5 km || 
|-id=554 bgcolor=#E9E9E9
| 413554 ||  || — || September 30, 2005 || Mount Lemmon || Mount Lemmon Survey || PAD || align=right | 1.6 km || 
|-id=555 bgcolor=#E9E9E9
| 413555 ||  || — || September 29, 2005 || Kitt Peak || Spacewatch || WIT || align=right | 1.1 km || 
|-id=556 bgcolor=#E9E9E9
| 413556 ||  || — || September 30, 2005 || Kitt Peak || Spacewatch || — || align=right | 1.9 km || 
|-id=557 bgcolor=#E9E9E9
| 413557 ||  || — || September 22, 2005 || Palomar || NEAT || — || align=right | 1.5 km || 
|-id=558 bgcolor=#E9E9E9
| 413558 ||  || — || September 29, 2005 || Anderson Mesa || LONEOS || — || align=right | 1.4 km || 
|-id=559 bgcolor=#E9E9E9
| 413559 ||  || — || September 30, 2005 || Mount Lemmon || Mount Lemmon Survey || — || align=right | 2.6 km || 
|-id=560 bgcolor=#E9E9E9
| 413560 ||  || — || September 24, 2005 || Apache Point || A. C. Becker || — || align=right | 1.4 km || 
|-id=561 bgcolor=#E9E9E9
| 413561 ||  || — || September 27, 2005 || Kitt Peak || Spacewatch || — || align=right | 2.3 km || 
|-id=562 bgcolor=#E9E9E9
| 413562 ||  || — || October 1, 2005 || Catalina || CSS || — || align=right | 2.0 km || 
|-id=563 bgcolor=#FFC2E0
| 413563 ||  || — || October 5, 2005 || Catalina || CSS || ATI +1km || align=right | 1.1 km || 
|-id=564 bgcolor=#E9E9E9
| 413564 ||  || — || October 1, 2005 || Mount Lemmon || Mount Lemmon Survey || — || align=right | 2.0 km || 
|-id=565 bgcolor=#E9E9E9
| 413565 ||  || — || October 6, 2005 || Catalina || CSS || — || align=right | 2.3 km || 
|-id=566 bgcolor=#E9E9E9
| 413566 ||  || — || October 4, 2005 || Mount Lemmon || Mount Lemmon Survey || — || align=right | 1.3 km || 
|-id=567 bgcolor=#E9E9E9
| 413567 ||  || — || October 6, 2005 || Catalina || CSS || — || align=right | 2.5 km || 
|-id=568 bgcolor=#E9E9E9
| 413568 ||  || — || October 7, 2005 || Anderson Mesa || LONEOS || — || align=right | 1.7 km || 
|-id=569 bgcolor=#E9E9E9
| 413569 ||  || — || October 7, 2005 || Kitt Peak || Spacewatch || — || align=right | 1.5 km || 
|-id=570 bgcolor=#E9E9E9
| 413570 ||  || — || October 7, 2005 || Kitt Peak || Spacewatch || — || align=right | 1.4 km || 
|-id=571 bgcolor=#E9E9E9
| 413571 ||  || — || September 30, 2005 || Mount Lemmon || Mount Lemmon Survey || — || align=right | 1.7 km || 
|-id=572 bgcolor=#E9E9E9
| 413572 ||  || — || September 29, 2005 || Kitt Peak || Spacewatch || — || align=right | 2.3 km || 
|-id=573 bgcolor=#E9E9E9
| 413573 ||  || — || September 24, 2005 || Kitt Peak || Spacewatch || — || align=right | 1.9 km || 
|-id=574 bgcolor=#E9E9E9
| 413574 ||  || — || October 9, 2005 || Kitt Peak || Spacewatch || — || align=right | 1.5 km || 
|-id=575 bgcolor=#E9E9E9
| 413575 ||  || — || September 26, 2005 || Catalina || CSS || EUN || align=right | 1.3 km || 
|-id=576 bgcolor=#E9E9E9
| 413576 ||  || — || October 25, 2005 || La Silla || R. Behrend, C. Vuissoz || — || align=right | 2.1 km || 
|-id=577 bgcolor=#FFC2E0
| 413577 ||  || — || October 27, 2005 || Socorro || LINEAR || ATEPHA || align=right data-sort-value="0.32" | 320 m || 
|-id=578 bgcolor=#FA8072
| 413578 ||  || — || October 26, 2005 || Kitt Peak || Spacewatch || — || align=right data-sort-value="0.49" | 490 m || 
|-id=579 bgcolor=#E9E9E9
| 413579 ||  || — || October 2, 2005 || Mount Lemmon || Mount Lemmon Survey || — || align=right | 1.7 km || 
|-id=580 bgcolor=#E9E9E9
| 413580 ||  || — || October 23, 2005 || Kitt Peak || Spacewatch || — || align=right | 2.6 km || 
|-id=581 bgcolor=#E9E9E9
| 413581 ||  || — || September 30, 2005 || Kitt Peak || Spacewatch || — || align=right | 2.3 km || 
|-id=582 bgcolor=#E9E9E9
| 413582 ||  || — || October 22, 2005 || Kitt Peak || Spacewatch || — || align=right | 2.1 km || 
|-id=583 bgcolor=#E9E9E9
| 413583 ||  || — || October 23, 2005 || Catalina || CSS || — || align=right | 2.3 km || 
|-id=584 bgcolor=#E9E9E9
| 413584 ||  || — || October 25, 2005 || Anderson Mesa || LONEOS || — || align=right | 3.2 km || 
|-id=585 bgcolor=#E9E9E9
| 413585 ||  || — || October 25, 2005 || Mount Lemmon || Mount Lemmon Survey || — || align=right | 2.0 km || 
|-id=586 bgcolor=#E9E9E9
| 413586 ||  || — || October 23, 2005 || Catalina || CSS || EUN || align=right | 1.7 km || 
|-id=587 bgcolor=#E9E9E9
| 413587 ||  || — || October 22, 2005 || Kitt Peak || Spacewatch || AGN || align=right | 1.1 km || 
|-id=588 bgcolor=#E9E9E9
| 413588 ||  || — || October 22, 2005 || Kitt Peak || Spacewatch || — || align=right | 2.0 km || 
|-id=589 bgcolor=#E9E9E9
| 413589 ||  || — || October 22, 2005 || Kitt Peak || Spacewatch || — || align=right | 2.2 km || 
|-id=590 bgcolor=#E9E9E9
| 413590 ||  || — || October 22, 2005 || Kitt Peak || Spacewatch || AGN || align=right | 1.4 km || 
|-id=591 bgcolor=#E9E9E9
| 413591 ||  || — || October 22, 2005 || Kitt Peak || Spacewatch || — || align=right | 2.6 km || 
|-id=592 bgcolor=#E9E9E9
| 413592 ||  || — || October 5, 2005 || Catalina || CSS || — || align=right | 2.1 km || 
|-id=593 bgcolor=#E9E9E9
| 413593 ||  || — || October 22, 2005 || Kitt Peak || Spacewatch || — || align=right | 2.8 km || 
|-id=594 bgcolor=#E9E9E9
| 413594 ||  || — || October 22, 2005 || Kitt Peak || Spacewatch || — || align=right | 2.3 km || 
|-id=595 bgcolor=#E9E9E9
| 413595 ||  || — || October 22, 2005 || Kitt Peak || Spacewatch || HOF || align=right | 2.4 km || 
|-id=596 bgcolor=#E9E9E9
| 413596 ||  || — || October 24, 2005 || Kitt Peak || Spacewatch || — || align=right | 1.8 km || 
|-id=597 bgcolor=#E9E9E9
| 413597 ||  || — || October 12, 2005 || Kitt Peak || Spacewatch || — || align=right | 1.9 km || 
|-id=598 bgcolor=#E9E9E9
| 413598 ||  || — || October 24, 2005 || Kitt Peak || Spacewatch || EUN || align=right | 1.5 km || 
|-id=599 bgcolor=#E9E9E9
| 413599 ||  || — || October 5, 2005 || Kitt Peak || Spacewatch || — || align=right | 3.0 km || 
|-id=600 bgcolor=#E9E9E9
| 413600 ||  || — || October 24, 2005 || Kitt Peak || Spacewatch || — || align=right | 2.2 km || 
|}

413601–413700 

|-bgcolor=#E9E9E9
| 413601 ||  || — || October 24, 2005 || Kitt Peak || Spacewatch || — || align=right | 2.3 km || 
|-id=602 bgcolor=#E9E9E9
| 413602 ||  || — || October 24, 2005 || Kitt Peak || Spacewatch || — || align=right | 2.1 km || 
|-id=603 bgcolor=#E9E9E9
| 413603 ||  || — || October 25, 2005 || Mount Lemmon || Mount Lemmon Survey || WIT || align=right data-sort-value="0.95" | 950 m || 
|-id=604 bgcolor=#E9E9E9
| 413604 ||  || — || October 22, 2005 || Kitt Peak || Spacewatch || — || align=right | 2.0 km || 
|-id=605 bgcolor=#E9E9E9
| 413605 ||  || — || October 25, 2005 || Kitt Peak || Spacewatch || HOF || align=right | 2.7 km || 
|-id=606 bgcolor=#E9E9E9
| 413606 ||  || — || October 25, 2005 || Mount Lemmon || Mount Lemmon Survey || — || align=right | 1.9 km || 
|-id=607 bgcolor=#E9E9E9
| 413607 ||  || — || October 27, 2005 || Kitt Peak || Spacewatch || — || align=right | 2.1 km || 
|-id=608 bgcolor=#E9E9E9
| 413608 ||  || — || October 25, 2005 || Kitt Peak || Spacewatch || — || align=right | 2.3 km || 
|-id=609 bgcolor=#E9E9E9
| 413609 ||  || — || October 25, 2005 || Kitt Peak || Spacewatch || AGN || align=right | 1.1 km || 
|-id=610 bgcolor=#E9E9E9
| 413610 ||  || — || October 25, 2005 || Kitt Peak || Spacewatch || AGN || align=right | 1.2 km || 
|-id=611 bgcolor=#E9E9E9
| 413611 ||  || — || October 25, 2005 || Kitt Peak || Spacewatch ||  || align=right | 2.3 km || 
|-id=612 bgcolor=#E9E9E9
| 413612 ||  || — || October 25, 2005 || Kitt Peak || Spacewatch || MRX || align=right | 1.2 km || 
|-id=613 bgcolor=#E9E9E9
| 413613 ||  || — || October 25, 2005 || Kitt Peak || Spacewatch || AGN || align=right | 1.1 km || 
|-id=614 bgcolor=#E9E9E9
| 413614 ||  || — || October 25, 2005 || Mount Lemmon || Mount Lemmon Survey || — || align=right | 3.5 km || 
|-id=615 bgcolor=#E9E9E9
| 413615 ||  || — || October 26, 2005 || Kitt Peak || Spacewatch || — || align=right | 2.1 km || 
|-id=616 bgcolor=#E9E9E9
| 413616 ||  || — || October 1, 2005 || Kitt Peak || Spacewatch || PAD || align=right | 1.6 km || 
|-id=617 bgcolor=#E9E9E9
| 413617 ||  || — || September 29, 2005 || Mount Lemmon || Mount Lemmon Survey || — || align=right | 2.1 km || 
|-id=618 bgcolor=#E9E9E9
| 413618 ||  || — || October 26, 2005 || Kitt Peak || Spacewatch || — || align=right | 1.9 km || 
|-id=619 bgcolor=#E9E9E9
| 413619 ||  || — || October 26, 2005 || Kitt Peak || Spacewatch || — || align=right | 1.9 km || 
|-id=620 bgcolor=#E9E9E9
| 413620 ||  || — || October 26, 2005 || Kitt Peak || Spacewatch || HOF || align=right | 2.5 km || 
|-id=621 bgcolor=#E9E9E9
| 413621 ||  || — || October 26, 2005 || Kitt Peak || Spacewatch || DOR || align=right | 2.3 km || 
|-id=622 bgcolor=#E9E9E9
| 413622 ||  || — || October 27, 2005 || Mount Lemmon || Mount Lemmon Survey || — || align=right | 2.2 km || 
|-id=623 bgcolor=#E9E9E9
| 413623 ||  || — || October 29, 2005 || Mount Lemmon || Mount Lemmon Survey || — || align=right | 2.0 km || 
|-id=624 bgcolor=#E9E9E9
| 413624 ||  || — || September 25, 2005 || Kitt Peak || Spacewatch || — || align=right | 2.4 km || 
|-id=625 bgcolor=#E9E9E9
| 413625 ||  || — || October 25, 2005 || Kitt Peak || Spacewatch || — || align=right | 2.2 km || 
|-id=626 bgcolor=#E9E9E9
| 413626 ||  || — || October 28, 2005 || Mount Lemmon || Mount Lemmon Survey || — || align=right | 2.4 km || 
|-id=627 bgcolor=#E9E9E9
| 413627 ||  || — || October 28, 2005 || Catalina || CSS || MRX || align=right | 1.0 km || 
|-id=628 bgcolor=#E9E9E9
| 413628 ||  || — || October 29, 2005 || Catalina || CSS || — || align=right | 3.7 km || 
|-id=629 bgcolor=#E9E9E9
| 413629 ||  || — || October 27, 2005 || Kitt Peak || Spacewatch || — || align=right | 2.4 km || 
|-id=630 bgcolor=#E9E9E9
| 413630 ||  || — || October 27, 2005 || Kitt Peak || Spacewatch || HOF || align=right | 2.5 km || 
|-id=631 bgcolor=#E9E9E9
| 413631 ||  || — || October 29, 2005 || Mount Lemmon || Mount Lemmon Survey || — || align=right | 2.4 km || 
|-id=632 bgcolor=#E9E9E9
| 413632 ||  || — || October 22, 2005 || Kitt Peak || Spacewatch || AEO || align=right | 1.2 km || 
|-id=633 bgcolor=#E9E9E9
| 413633 ||  || — || October 26, 2005 || Kitt Peak || Spacewatch || PAD || align=right | 1.9 km || 
|-id=634 bgcolor=#d6d6d6
| 413634 ||  || — || October 30, 2005 || Kitt Peak || Spacewatch || KOR || align=right | 1.2 km || 
|-id=635 bgcolor=#E9E9E9
| 413635 ||  || — || October 25, 2005 || Kitt Peak || Spacewatch || — || align=right | 1.7 km || 
|-id=636 bgcolor=#E9E9E9
| 413636 ||  || — || October 25, 2005 || Kitt Peak || Spacewatch || — || align=right | 1.7 km || 
|-id=637 bgcolor=#E9E9E9
| 413637 ||  || — || October 12, 2005 || Kitt Peak || Spacewatch || — || align=right | 2.0 km || 
|-id=638 bgcolor=#E9E9E9
| 413638 ||  || — || October 29, 2005 || Catalina || CSS || — || align=right | 3.7 km || 
|-id=639 bgcolor=#E9E9E9
| 413639 ||  || — || October 30, 2005 || Kitt Peak || Spacewatch || — || align=right | 2.2 km || 
|-id=640 bgcolor=#E9E9E9
| 413640 ||  || — || October 12, 2005 || Kitt Peak || Spacewatch || — || align=right | 2.1 km || 
|-id=641 bgcolor=#E9E9E9
| 413641 ||  || — || October 22, 2005 || Kitt Peak || Spacewatch || — || align=right | 2.3 km || 
|-id=642 bgcolor=#E9E9E9
| 413642 ||  || — || September 23, 2005 || Kitt Peak || Spacewatch || — || align=right | 2.3 km || 
|-id=643 bgcolor=#E9E9E9
| 413643 ||  || — || October 24, 2005 || Palomar || NEAT || — || align=right | 1.8 km || 
|-id=644 bgcolor=#E9E9E9
| 413644 ||  || — || October 27, 2005 || Catalina || CSS || — || align=right | 2.1 km || 
|-id=645 bgcolor=#E9E9E9
| 413645 ||  || — || October 1, 2005 || Mount Lemmon || Mount Lemmon Survey || — || align=right | 1.5 km || 
|-id=646 bgcolor=#E9E9E9
| 413646 ||  || — || November 7, 2005 || Marly || Naef Obs. || — || align=right | 2.7 km || 
|-id=647 bgcolor=#E9E9E9
| 413647 ||  || — || November 12, 2005 || Wrightwood || J. W. Young || — || align=right | 2.9 km || 
|-id=648 bgcolor=#E9E9E9
| 413648 ||  || — || October 5, 2005 || Kitt Peak || Spacewatch || — || align=right | 2.2 km || 
|-id=649 bgcolor=#E9E9E9
| 413649 ||  || — || November 3, 2005 || Mount Lemmon || Mount Lemmon Survey || AGN || align=right | 1.2 km || 
|-id=650 bgcolor=#E9E9E9
| 413650 ||  || — || November 3, 2005 || Kitt Peak || Spacewatch || — || align=right | 2.3 km || 
|-id=651 bgcolor=#E9E9E9
| 413651 ||  || — || November 1, 2005 || Kitt Peak || Spacewatch || — || align=right | 1.0 km || 
|-id=652 bgcolor=#E9E9E9
| 413652 ||  || — || November 1, 2005 || Kitt Peak || Spacewatch || — || align=right | 2.3 km || 
|-id=653 bgcolor=#E9E9E9
| 413653 ||  || — || April 25, 2004 || Kitt Peak || Spacewatch || — || align=right | 2.1 km || 
|-id=654 bgcolor=#E9E9E9
| 413654 ||  || — || November 3, 2005 || Mount Lemmon || Mount Lemmon Survey || — || align=right | 2.5 km || 
|-id=655 bgcolor=#E9E9E9
| 413655 ||  || — || October 10, 2005 || Kitt Peak || Spacewatch || — || align=right | 2.3 km || 
|-id=656 bgcolor=#E9E9E9
| 413656 ||  || — || November 4, 2005 || Mount Lemmon || Mount Lemmon Survey || — || align=right | 2.4 km || 
|-id=657 bgcolor=#E9E9E9
| 413657 ||  || — || November 4, 2005 || Mount Lemmon || Mount Lemmon Survey || — || align=right | 2.8 km || 
|-id=658 bgcolor=#E9E9E9
| 413658 ||  || — || November 5, 2005 || Kitt Peak || Spacewatch || — || align=right | 2.6 km || 
|-id=659 bgcolor=#E9E9E9
| 413659 ||  || — || November 5, 2005 || Socorro || LINEAR || — || align=right | 2.2 km || 
|-id=660 bgcolor=#E9E9E9
| 413660 ||  || — || November 1, 2005 || Mount Lemmon || Mount Lemmon Survey || — || align=right | 2.6 km || 
|-id=661 bgcolor=#E9E9E9
| 413661 ||  || — || November 1, 2005 || Mount Lemmon || Mount Lemmon Survey || — || align=right | 2.1 km || 
|-id=662 bgcolor=#E9E9E9
| 413662 ||  || — || November 4, 2005 || Catalina || CSS || — || align=right | 2.2 km || 
|-id=663 bgcolor=#E9E9E9
| 413663 ||  || — || October 1, 2005 || Mount Lemmon || Mount Lemmon Survey || — || align=right | 2.0 km || 
|-id=664 bgcolor=#E9E9E9
| 413664 ||  || — || April 5, 2003 || Kitt Peak || Spacewatch || NEM || align=right | 2.1 km || 
|-id=665 bgcolor=#E9E9E9
| 413665 ||  || — || November 5, 2005 || Catalina || CSS || — || align=right | 2.2 km || 
|-id=666 bgcolor=#C2E0FF
| 413666 ||  || — || November 7, 2005 || Mauna Kea || F. Bernardi || centaurcritical || align=right | 29 km || 
|-id=667 bgcolor=#E9E9E9
| 413667 ||  || — || November 1, 2005 || Apache Point || A. C. Becker || — || align=right | 1.6 km || 
|-id=668 bgcolor=#E9E9E9
| 413668 ||  || — || November 1, 2005 || Apache Point || A. C. Becker ||  || align=right | 1.5 km || 
|-id=669 bgcolor=#E9E9E9
| 413669 ||  || — || November 24, 2005 || Palomar || NEAT || — || align=right | 2.4 km || 
|-id=670 bgcolor=#E9E9E9
| 413670 ||  || — || November 21, 2005 || Kitt Peak || Spacewatch || — || align=right | 2.5 km || 
|-id=671 bgcolor=#E9E9E9
| 413671 ||  || — || November 21, 2005 || Kitt Peak || Spacewatch || AGN || align=right | 1.1 km || 
|-id=672 bgcolor=#E9E9E9
| 413672 ||  || — || November 21, 2005 || Kitt Peak || Spacewatch || — || align=right | 2.5 km || 
|-id=673 bgcolor=#E9E9E9
| 413673 ||  || — || November 21, 2005 || Kitt Peak || Spacewatch || — || align=right | 1.8 km || 
|-id=674 bgcolor=#E9E9E9
| 413674 ||  || — || November 25, 2005 || Mount Lemmon || Mount Lemmon Survey || — || align=right | 2.7 km || 
|-id=675 bgcolor=#E9E9E9
| 413675 ||  || — || November 22, 2005 || Kitt Peak || Spacewatch || — || align=right | 2.0 km || 
|-id=676 bgcolor=#E9E9E9
| 413676 ||  || — || November 25, 2005 || Kitt Peak || Spacewatch || — || align=right | 1.9 km || 
|-id=677 bgcolor=#E9E9E9
| 413677 ||  || — || November 25, 2005 || Kitt Peak || Spacewatch || HOF || align=right | 2.6 km || 
|-id=678 bgcolor=#E9E9E9
| 413678 ||  || — || November 25, 2005 || Mount Lemmon || Mount Lemmon Survey || — || align=right | 2.0 km || 
|-id=679 bgcolor=#E9E9E9
| 413679 ||  || — || November 22, 2005 || Kitt Peak || Spacewatch || — || align=right | 2.3 km || 
|-id=680 bgcolor=#E9E9E9
| 413680 ||  || — || November 6, 2005 || Mount Lemmon || Mount Lemmon Survey || — || align=right | 2.2 km || 
|-id=681 bgcolor=#d6d6d6
| 413681 ||  || — || November 26, 2005 || Kitt Peak || Spacewatch || KOR || align=right | 1.1 km || 
|-id=682 bgcolor=#E9E9E9
| 413682 ||  || — || October 27, 2005 || Mount Lemmon || Mount Lemmon Survey || — || align=right | 2.6 km || 
|-id=683 bgcolor=#E9E9E9
| 413683 ||  || — || November 22, 2005 || Kitt Peak || Spacewatch || — || align=right | 2.4 km || 
|-id=684 bgcolor=#E9E9E9
| 413684 ||  || — || November 1, 2005 || Mount Lemmon || Mount Lemmon Survey || AEO || align=right data-sort-value="0.99" | 990 m || 
|-id=685 bgcolor=#E9E9E9
| 413685 ||  || — || November 25, 2005 || Kitt Peak || Spacewatch || AGN || align=right | 1.2 km || 
|-id=686 bgcolor=#E9E9E9
| 413686 ||  || — || December 2, 2005 || Socorro || LINEAR || — || align=right | 2.3 km || 
|-id=687 bgcolor=#E9E9E9
| 413687 ||  || — || November 26, 2005 || Kitt Peak || Spacewatch || — || align=right | 2.0 km || 
|-id=688 bgcolor=#E9E9E9
| 413688 ||  || — || December 2, 2005 || Kitt Peak || Spacewatch || — || align=right | 2.1 km || 
|-id=689 bgcolor=#E9E9E9
| 413689 ||  || — || December 2, 2005 || Kitt Peak || Spacewatch || — || align=right | 2.6 km || 
|-id=690 bgcolor=#E9E9E9
| 413690 ||  || — || December 2, 2005 || Mount Lemmon || Mount Lemmon Survey || — || align=right | 2.1 km || 
|-id=691 bgcolor=#d6d6d6
| 413691 ||  || — || December 5, 2005 || Mount Lemmon || Mount Lemmon Survey || KOR || align=right | 1.3 km || 
|-id=692 bgcolor=#E9E9E9
| 413692 ||  || — || December 7, 2005 || Catalina || CSS || — || align=right | 2.7 km || 
|-id=693 bgcolor=#E9E9E9
| 413693 ||  || — || December 6, 2005 || Catalina || CSS || — || align=right | 2.3 km || 
|-id=694 bgcolor=#d6d6d6
| 413694 ||  || — || December 1, 2005 || Kitt Peak || M. W. Buie || — || align=right | 2.1 km || 
|-id=695 bgcolor=#E9E9E9
| 413695 ||  || — || December 21, 2005 || Kitt Peak || Spacewatch || — || align=right | 2.0 km || 
|-id=696 bgcolor=#E9E9E9
| 413696 ||  || — || October 1, 2005 || Mount Lemmon || Mount Lemmon Survey || MRX || align=right | 1.0 km || 
|-id=697 bgcolor=#E9E9E9
| 413697 ||  || — || December 22, 2005 || Kitt Peak || Spacewatch || — || align=right | 1.8 km || 
|-id=698 bgcolor=#E9E9E9
| 413698 ||  || — || December 24, 2005 || Kitt Peak || Spacewatch || — || align=right | 1.7 km || 
|-id=699 bgcolor=#d6d6d6
| 413699 ||  || — || December 4, 2005 || Mount Lemmon || Mount Lemmon Survey || — || align=right | 2.2 km || 
|-id=700 bgcolor=#d6d6d6
| 413700 ||  || — || December 22, 2005 || Kitt Peak || Spacewatch || — || align=right | 2.9 km || 
|}

413701–413800 

|-bgcolor=#d6d6d6
| 413701 ||  || — || December 24, 2005 || Kitt Peak || Spacewatch || — || align=right | 3.1 km || 
|-id=702 bgcolor=#d6d6d6
| 413702 ||  || — || December 25, 2005 || Kitt Peak || Spacewatch || — || align=right | 2.4 km || 
|-id=703 bgcolor=#E9E9E9
| 413703 ||  || — || October 3, 2005 || Catalina || CSS || — || align=right | 1.9 km || 
|-id=704 bgcolor=#d6d6d6
| 413704 ||  || — || December 5, 2005 || Mount Lemmon || Mount Lemmon Survey || — || align=right | 2.3 km || 
|-id=705 bgcolor=#d6d6d6
| 413705 ||  || — || December 8, 2005 || Kitt Peak || Spacewatch || — || align=right | 2.4 km || 
|-id=706 bgcolor=#d6d6d6
| 413706 ||  || — || December 2, 2005 || Mount Lemmon || Mount Lemmon Survey || — || align=right | 2.3 km || 
|-id=707 bgcolor=#E9E9E9
| 413707 ||  || — || December 28, 2005 || Mount Lemmon || Mount Lemmon Survey || AEO || align=right | 1.7 km || 
|-id=708 bgcolor=#E9E9E9
| 413708 ||  || — || December 27, 2005 || Mount Lemmon || Mount Lemmon Survey || — || align=right | 1.8 km || 
|-id=709 bgcolor=#d6d6d6
| 413709 ||  || — || November 10, 2005 || Mount Lemmon || Mount Lemmon Survey ||  || align=right | 2.8 km || 
|-id=710 bgcolor=#E9E9E9
| 413710 ||  || — || December 30, 2005 || Kitt Peak || Spacewatch || AGN || align=right | 1.2 km || 
|-id=711 bgcolor=#fefefe
| 413711 ||  || — || December 30, 2005 || Kitt Peak || Spacewatch || — || align=right data-sort-value="0.65" | 650 m || 
|-id=712 bgcolor=#C2FFFF
| 413712 ||  || — || December 28, 2005 || Kitt Peak || Spacewatch || L5 || align=right | 7.8 km || 
|-id=713 bgcolor=#d6d6d6
| 413713 ||  || — || December 28, 2005 || Kitt Peak || Spacewatch || BRA || align=right | 1.3 km || 
|-id=714 bgcolor=#E9E9E9
| 413714 ||  || — || December 26, 2005 || Mount Lemmon || Mount Lemmon Survey || JUN || align=right | 1.3 km || 
|-id=715 bgcolor=#fefefe
| 413715 ||  || — || December 27, 2005 || Mount Lemmon || Mount Lemmon Survey || — || align=right data-sort-value="0.60" | 600 m || 
|-id=716 bgcolor=#d6d6d6
| 413716 ||  || — || November 30, 2005 || Mount Lemmon || Mount Lemmon Survey || — || align=right | 2.9 km || 
|-id=717 bgcolor=#d6d6d6
| 413717 ||  || — || January 7, 2006 || Mount Lemmon || Mount Lemmon Survey || — || align=right | 2.0 km || 
|-id=718 bgcolor=#d6d6d6
| 413718 ||  || — || January 6, 2006 || Mount Lemmon || Mount Lemmon Survey || — || align=right | 1.7 km || 
|-id=719 bgcolor=#E9E9E9
| 413719 ||  || — || January 22, 2006 || Anderson Mesa || LONEOS || — || align=right | 2.3 km || 
|-id=720 bgcolor=#d6d6d6
| 413720 ||  || — || January 10, 2006 || Mount Lemmon || Mount Lemmon Survey || — || align=right | 2.3 km || 
|-id=721 bgcolor=#d6d6d6
| 413721 ||  || — || January 23, 2006 || Kitt Peak || Spacewatch || EOS || align=right | 1.9 km || 
|-id=722 bgcolor=#d6d6d6
| 413722 ||  || — || January 23, 2006 || Kitt Peak || Spacewatch || — || align=right | 3.2 km || 
|-id=723 bgcolor=#d6d6d6
| 413723 ||  || — || January 23, 2006 || Kitt Peak || Spacewatch || — || align=right | 2.2 km || 
|-id=724 bgcolor=#d6d6d6
| 413724 ||  || — || January 23, 2006 || Kitt Peak || Spacewatch || — || align=right | 3.0 km || 
|-id=725 bgcolor=#E9E9E9
| 413725 ||  || — || January 25, 2006 || Kitt Peak || Spacewatch || — || align=right | 2.4 km || 
|-id=726 bgcolor=#d6d6d6
| 413726 ||  || — || January 25, 2006 || Kitt Peak || Spacewatch || — || align=right | 2.2 km || 
|-id=727 bgcolor=#d6d6d6
| 413727 ||  || — || January 26, 2006 || Kitt Peak || Spacewatch || — || align=right | 2.3 km || 
|-id=728 bgcolor=#d6d6d6
| 413728 ||  || — || January 26, 2006 || Kitt Peak || Spacewatch || EOS || align=right | 1.8 km || 
|-id=729 bgcolor=#fefefe
| 413729 ||  || — || January 26, 2006 || Kitt Peak || Spacewatch || — || align=right data-sort-value="0.73" | 730 m || 
|-id=730 bgcolor=#d6d6d6
| 413730 ||  || — || January 28, 2006 || Mount Lemmon || Mount Lemmon Survey || — || align=right | 2.6 km || 
|-id=731 bgcolor=#fefefe
| 413731 ||  || — || January 25, 2006 || Kitt Peak || Spacewatch || — || align=right data-sort-value="0.67" | 670 m || 
|-id=732 bgcolor=#d6d6d6
| 413732 ||  || — || January 7, 2006 || Mount Lemmon || Mount Lemmon Survey || — || align=right | 2.5 km || 
|-id=733 bgcolor=#d6d6d6
| 413733 ||  || — || January 27, 2006 || Kitt Peak || Spacewatch || — || align=right | 2.9 km || 
|-id=734 bgcolor=#d6d6d6
| 413734 ||  || — || January 27, 2006 || Mount Lemmon || Mount Lemmon Survey || — || align=right | 2.1 km || 
|-id=735 bgcolor=#fefefe
| 413735 ||  || — || January 31, 2006 || Mount Lemmon || Mount Lemmon Survey || — || align=right data-sort-value="0.66" | 660 m || 
|-id=736 bgcolor=#d6d6d6
| 413736 ||  || — || January 31, 2006 || Mount Lemmon || Mount Lemmon Survey || KOR || align=right | 1.2 km || 
|-id=737 bgcolor=#E9E9E9
| 413737 ||  || — || January 26, 2006 || Catalina || CSS || — || align=right | 2.8 km || 
|-id=738 bgcolor=#d6d6d6
| 413738 ||  || — || January 23, 2006 || Kitt Peak || Spacewatch || — || align=right | 1.6 km || 
|-id=739 bgcolor=#d6d6d6
| 413739 ||  || — || January 31, 2006 || Kitt Peak || Spacewatch || — || align=right | 3.4 km || 
|-id=740 bgcolor=#d6d6d6
| 413740 ||  || — || January 23, 2006 || Kitt Peak || Spacewatch || — || align=right | 3.1 km || 
|-id=741 bgcolor=#fefefe
| 413741 ||  || — || January 31, 2006 || Kitt Peak || Spacewatch || — || align=right data-sort-value="0.84" | 840 m || 
|-id=742 bgcolor=#fefefe
| 413742 ||  || — || January 31, 2006 || Kitt Peak || Spacewatch || — || align=right data-sort-value="0.91" | 910 m || 
|-id=743 bgcolor=#d6d6d6
| 413743 ||  || — || January 31, 2006 || Kitt Peak || Spacewatch || — || align=right | 3.3 km || 
|-id=744 bgcolor=#fefefe
| 413744 ||  || — || January 31, 2006 || Kitt Peak || Spacewatch || — || align=right data-sort-value="0.86" | 860 m || 
|-id=745 bgcolor=#E9E9E9
| 413745 ||  || — || January 31, 2006 || Anderson Mesa || LONEOS || — || align=right | 2.7 km || 
|-id=746 bgcolor=#d6d6d6
| 413746 ||  || — || January 30, 2006 || Kitt Peak || Spacewatch || — || align=right | 2.0 km || 
|-id=747 bgcolor=#d6d6d6
| 413747 ||  || — || January 9, 2006 || Kitt Peak || Spacewatch || — || align=right | 2.8 km || 
|-id=748 bgcolor=#E9E9E9
| 413748 ||  || — || February 1, 2006 || Kitt Peak || Spacewatch || — || align=right | 3.0 km || 
|-id=749 bgcolor=#d6d6d6
| 413749 ||  || — || January 10, 2006 || Mount Lemmon || Mount Lemmon Survey || EOS || align=right | 2.4 km || 
|-id=750 bgcolor=#d6d6d6
| 413750 ||  || — || January 27, 2006 || Mount Lemmon || Mount Lemmon Survey || — || align=right | 2.4 km || 
|-id=751 bgcolor=#d6d6d6
| 413751 ||  || — || February 2, 2006 || Kitt Peak || Spacewatch || EOS || align=right | 2.2 km || 
|-id=752 bgcolor=#d6d6d6
| 413752 ||  || — || February 22, 2006 || Catalina || CSS || — || align=right | 4.1 km || 
|-id=753 bgcolor=#d6d6d6
| 413753 ||  || — || January 30, 2006 || Kitt Peak || Spacewatch || — || align=right | 2.9 km || 
|-id=754 bgcolor=#fefefe
| 413754 ||  || — || January 26, 2006 || Kitt Peak || Spacewatch || — || align=right data-sort-value="0.54" | 540 m || 
|-id=755 bgcolor=#d6d6d6
| 413755 ||  || — || February 20, 2006 || Kitt Peak || Spacewatch || EOS || align=right | 4.2 km || 
|-id=756 bgcolor=#d6d6d6
| 413756 ||  || — || February 25, 2006 || Kitt Peak || Spacewatch || — || align=right | 2.6 km || 
|-id=757 bgcolor=#fefefe
| 413757 ||  || — || October 13, 2004 || Kitt Peak || Spacewatch || — || align=right data-sort-value="0.64" | 640 m || 
|-id=758 bgcolor=#d6d6d6
| 413758 ||  || — || February 27, 2006 || Kitt Peak || Spacewatch || EOS || align=right | 2.5 km || 
|-id=759 bgcolor=#d6d6d6
| 413759 ||  || — || February 20, 2006 || Catalina || CSS || — || align=right | 3.4 km || 
|-id=760 bgcolor=#d6d6d6
| 413760 ||  || — || February 25, 2006 || Kitt Peak || Spacewatch || — || align=right | 4.0 km || 
|-id=761 bgcolor=#d6d6d6
| 413761 ||  || — || February 27, 2006 || Kitt Peak || Spacewatch || — || align=right | 2.7 km || 
|-id=762 bgcolor=#d6d6d6
| 413762 ||  || — || February 27, 2006 || Kitt Peak || Spacewatch || EOS || align=right | 2.0 km || 
|-id=763 bgcolor=#fefefe
| 413763 ||  || — || February 27, 2006 || Kitt Peak || Spacewatch || — || align=right data-sort-value="0.81" | 810 m || 
|-id=764 bgcolor=#d6d6d6
| 413764 ||  || — || February 20, 2006 || Catalina || CSS || — || align=right | 4.7 km || 
|-id=765 bgcolor=#d6d6d6
| 413765 ||  || — || February 25, 2006 || Mount Lemmon || Mount Lemmon Survey || EOS || align=right | 1.6 km || 
|-id=766 bgcolor=#d6d6d6
| 413766 ||  || — || February 20, 2006 || Kitt Peak || Spacewatch || EOS || align=right | 1.7 km || 
|-id=767 bgcolor=#fefefe
| 413767 ||  || — || March 2, 2006 || Kitt Peak || Spacewatch || — || align=right data-sort-value="0.63" | 630 m || 
|-id=768 bgcolor=#fefefe
| 413768 ||  || — || March 2, 2006 || Kitt Peak || Spacewatch || — || align=right data-sort-value="0.52" | 520 m || 
|-id=769 bgcolor=#d6d6d6
| 413769 ||  || — || March 4, 2006 || Mount Lemmon || Mount Lemmon Survey || — || align=right | 2.4 km || 
|-id=770 bgcolor=#fefefe
| 413770 ||  || — || October 9, 2004 || Kitt Peak || Spacewatch || — || align=right data-sort-value="0.82" | 820 m || 
|-id=771 bgcolor=#d6d6d6
| 413771 ||  || — || March 24, 2006 || Mount Lemmon || Mount Lemmon Survey || EOS || align=right | 2.1 km || 
|-id=772 bgcolor=#fefefe
| 413772 ||  || — || March 24, 2006 || Mount Lemmon || Mount Lemmon Survey || — || align=right data-sort-value="0.79" | 790 m || 
|-id=773 bgcolor=#d6d6d6
| 413773 ||  || — || April 7, 2006 || Mount Lemmon || Mount Lemmon Survey || — || align=right | 3.7 km || 
|-id=774 bgcolor=#fefefe
| 413774 ||  || — || April 8, 2006 || Kitt Peak || Spacewatch || — || align=right data-sort-value="0.82" | 820 m || 
|-id=775 bgcolor=#d6d6d6
| 413775 ||  || — || April 2, 2006 || Anderson Mesa || LONEOS || — || align=right | 3.9 km || 
|-id=776 bgcolor=#d6d6d6
| 413776 ||  || — || October 19, 2003 || Kitt Peak || Spacewatch || — || align=right | 2.6 km || 
|-id=777 bgcolor=#fefefe
| 413777 ||  || — || April 19, 2006 || Palomar || NEAT || — || align=right data-sort-value="0.84" | 840 m || 
|-id=778 bgcolor=#d6d6d6
| 413778 ||  || — || April 9, 2006 || Catalina || CSS || — || align=right | 4.7 km || 
|-id=779 bgcolor=#d6d6d6
| 413779 ||  || — || April 20, 2006 || Kitt Peak || Spacewatch || — || align=right | 3.2 km || 
|-id=780 bgcolor=#fefefe
| 413780 ||  || — || April 20, 2006 || Kitt Peak || Spacewatch || V || align=right data-sort-value="0.78" | 780 m || 
|-id=781 bgcolor=#fefefe
| 413781 ||  || — || April 20, 2006 || Kitt Peak || Spacewatch || V || align=right data-sort-value="0.65" | 650 m || 
|-id=782 bgcolor=#d6d6d6
| 413782 ||  || — || April 20, 2006 || Kitt Peak || Spacewatch || — || align=right | 3.6 km || 
|-id=783 bgcolor=#d6d6d6
| 413783 ||  || — || April 19, 2006 || Kitt Peak || Spacewatch || — || align=right | 3.9 km || 
|-id=784 bgcolor=#d6d6d6
| 413784 ||  || — || April 25, 2006 || Kitt Peak || Spacewatch || — || align=right | 3.4 km || 
|-id=785 bgcolor=#d6d6d6
| 413785 ||  || — || April 25, 2006 || Catalina || CSS || — || align=right | 3.7 km || 
|-id=786 bgcolor=#d6d6d6
| 413786 ||  || — || April 19, 2006 || Anderson Mesa || LONEOS || — || align=right | 4.0 km || 
|-id=787 bgcolor=#fefefe
| 413787 ||  || — || April 24, 2006 || Mount Lemmon || Mount Lemmon Survey || — || align=right | 1.5 km || 
|-id=788 bgcolor=#fefefe
| 413788 ||  || — || April 25, 2006 || Kitt Peak || Spacewatch || — || align=right data-sort-value="0.91" | 910 m || 
|-id=789 bgcolor=#d6d6d6
| 413789 ||  || — || April 30, 2006 || Kitt Peak || Spacewatch || — || align=right | 2.7 km || 
|-id=790 bgcolor=#d6d6d6
| 413790 ||  || — || April 30, 2006 || Kitt Peak || Spacewatch || VER || align=right | 2.7 km || 
|-id=791 bgcolor=#d6d6d6
| 413791 ||  || — || April 30, 2006 || Kitt Peak || Spacewatch || — || align=right | 2.7 km || 
|-id=792 bgcolor=#fefefe
| 413792 ||  || — || April 30, 2006 || Kitt Peak || Spacewatch || — || align=right data-sort-value="0.90" | 900 m || 
|-id=793 bgcolor=#d6d6d6
| 413793 ||  || — || April 30, 2006 || Kitt Peak || Spacewatch || — || align=right | 3.1 km || 
|-id=794 bgcolor=#d6d6d6
| 413794 ||  || — || April 30, 2006 || Kitt Peak || Spacewatch || — || align=right | 3.8 km || 
|-id=795 bgcolor=#d6d6d6
| 413795 ||  || — || April 30, 2006 || Kitt Peak || Spacewatch || — || align=right | 3.3 km || 
|-id=796 bgcolor=#fefefe
| 413796 ||  || — || April 30, 2006 || Anderson Mesa || LONEOS || — || align=right data-sort-value="0.70" | 700 m || 
|-id=797 bgcolor=#d6d6d6
| 413797 ||  || — || April 19, 2006 || Mount Lemmon || Mount Lemmon Survey || — || align=right | 3.6 km || 
|-id=798 bgcolor=#d6d6d6
| 413798 ||  || — || April 30, 2006 || Kitt Peak || Spacewatch || EOS || align=right | 2.3 km || 
|-id=799 bgcolor=#d6d6d6
| 413799 ||  || — || May 1, 2006 || Kitt Peak || Spacewatch || — || align=right | 3.4 km || 
|-id=800 bgcolor=#d6d6d6
| 413800 ||  || — || May 2, 2006 || Mount Lemmon || Mount Lemmon Survey || — || align=right | 5.3 km || 
|}

413801–413900 

|-bgcolor=#fefefe
| 413801 ||  || — || May 1, 2006 || Kitt Peak || Spacewatch || — || align=right data-sort-value="0.98" | 980 m || 
|-id=802 bgcolor=#d6d6d6
| 413802 ||  || — || May 1, 2006 || Kitt Peak || Spacewatch || — || align=right | 2.6 km || 
|-id=803 bgcolor=#d6d6d6
| 413803 ||  || — || May 3, 2006 || Kitt Peak || Spacewatch || — || align=right | 4.4 km || 
|-id=804 bgcolor=#d6d6d6
| 413804 ||  || — || May 4, 2006 || Kitt Peak || Spacewatch || — || align=right | 3.1 km || 
|-id=805 bgcolor=#d6d6d6
| 413805 ||  || — || May 6, 2006 || Kitt Peak || Spacewatch || — || align=right | 4.4 km || 
|-id=806 bgcolor=#fefefe
| 413806 ||  || — || May 1, 2006 || Kitt Peak || Spacewatch || — || align=right data-sort-value="0.73" | 730 m || 
|-id=807 bgcolor=#d6d6d6
| 413807 ||  || — || May 21, 2006 || Kitt Peak || Spacewatch || — || align=right | 4.1 km || 
|-id=808 bgcolor=#fefefe
| 413808 ||  || — || May 20, 2006 || Kitt Peak || Spacewatch || — || align=right data-sort-value="0.63" | 630 m || 
|-id=809 bgcolor=#d6d6d6
| 413809 ||  || — || March 1, 2005 || Kitt Peak || Spacewatch || ELF || align=right | 3.2 km || 
|-id=810 bgcolor=#d6d6d6
| 413810 ||  || — || May 20, 2006 || Kitt Peak || Spacewatch || — || align=right | 3.9 km || 
|-id=811 bgcolor=#d6d6d6
| 413811 ||  || — || May 24, 2006 || Palomar || NEAT || — || align=right | 4.4 km || 
|-id=812 bgcolor=#fefefe
| 413812 ||  || — || May 24, 2006 || Kitt Peak || Spacewatch || — || align=right data-sort-value="0.93" | 930 m || 
|-id=813 bgcolor=#fefefe
| 413813 ||  || — || May 29, 2006 || Vail-Jarnac || Jarnac Obs. || H || align=right data-sort-value="0.61" | 610 m || 
|-id=814 bgcolor=#d6d6d6
| 413814 ||  || — || June 15, 2006 || Kitt Peak || Spacewatch || — || align=right | 3.0 km || 
|-id=815 bgcolor=#fefefe
| 413815 ||  || — || August 13, 2006 || Palomar || NEAT || — || align=right data-sort-value="0.81" | 810 m || 
|-id=816 bgcolor=#fefefe
| 413816 ||  || — || August 13, 2006 || Palomar || NEAT || NYS || align=right data-sort-value="0.76" | 760 m || 
|-id=817 bgcolor=#fefefe
| 413817 ||  || — || August 15, 2006 || Palomar || NEAT || — || align=right | 2.2 km || 
|-id=818 bgcolor=#fefefe
| 413818 ||  || — || August 17, 2006 || Palomar || NEAT || NYS || align=right data-sort-value="0.76" | 760 m || 
|-id=819 bgcolor=#fefefe
| 413819 ||  || — || August 17, 2006 || Palomar || NEAT || — || align=right data-sort-value="0.81" | 810 m || 
|-id=820 bgcolor=#FFC2E0
| 413820 ||  || — || August 29, 2006 || Kitt Peak || Spacewatch || AMO || align=right data-sort-value="0.66" | 660 m || 
|-id=821 bgcolor=#FA8072
| 413821 ||  || — || August 28, 2006 || Catalina || CSS || — || align=right | 1.1 km || 
|-id=822 bgcolor=#fefefe
| 413822 ||  || — || August 24, 2006 || Socorro || LINEAR || — || align=right | 1.7 km || 
|-id=823 bgcolor=#fefefe
| 413823 ||  || — || August 25, 2006 || Socorro || LINEAR || — || align=right | 1.1 km || 
|-id=824 bgcolor=#fefefe
| 413824 ||  || — || August 18, 2006 || Kitt Peak || Spacewatch || — || align=right data-sort-value="0.75" | 750 m || 
|-id=825 bgcolor=#fefefe
| 413825 ||  || — || August 18, 2006 || Kitt Peak || Spacewatch || — || align=right data-sort-value="0.77" | 770 m || 
|-id=826 bgcolor=#E9E9E9
| 413826 ||  || — || August 21, 2006 || Kitt Peak || Spacewatch || RAF || align=right data-sort-value="0.83" | 830 m || 
|-id=827 bgcolor=#fefefe
| 413827 ||  || — || August 29, 2006 || Kitt Peak || Spacewatch || — || align=right data-sort-value="0.85" | 850 m || 
|-id=828 bgcolor=#fefefe
| 413828 ||  || — || September 12, 2006 || Catalina || CSS || — || align=right data-sort-value="0.91" | 910 m || 
|-id=829 bgcolor=#fefefe
| 413829 ||  || — || September 15, 2006 || Kitt Peak || Spacewatch || NYS || align=right data-sort-value="0.85" | 850 m || 
|-id=830 bgcolor=#fefefe
| 413830 ||  || — || September 15, 2006 || Kitt Peak || Spacewatch || critical || align=right data-sort-value="0.62" | 620 m || 
|-id=831 bgcolor=#fefefe
| 413831 ||  || — || September 15, 2006 || Kitt Peak || Spacewatch || — || align=right data-sort-value="0.69" | 690 m || 
|-id=832 bgcolor=#fefefe
| 413832 ||  || — || September 15, 2006 || Kitt Peak || Spacewatch || — || align=right data-sort-value="0.70" | 700 m || 
|-id=833 bgcolor=#fefefe
| 413833 ||  || — || September 19, 2006 || Catalina || CSS || — || align=right data-sort-value="0.73" | 730 m || 
|-id=834 bgcolor=#d6d6d6
| 413834 ||  || — || September 17, 2006 || Anderson Mesa || LONEOS || 3:2 || align=right | 5.1 km || 
|-id=835 bgcolor=#fefefe
| 413835 ||  || — || August 29, 2006 || Catalina || CSS || — || align=right | 1.0 km || 
|-id=836 bgcolor=#fefefe
| 413836 ||  || — || September 17, 2006 || Socorro || LINEAR || — || align=right data-sort-value="0.84" | 840 m || 
|-id=837 bgcolor=#d6d6d6
| 413837 ||  || — || September 18, 2006 || Kitt Peak || Spacewatch || SHU3:2 || align=right | 4.6 km || 
|-id=838 bgcolor=#E9E9E9
| 413838 ||  || — || September 18, 2006 || Kitt Peak || Spacewatch || — || align=right | 1.1 km || 
|-id=839 bgcolor=#fefefe
| 413839 ||  || — || September 19, 2006 || Kitt Peak || Spacewatch || — || align=right data-sort-value="0.71" | 710 m || 
|-id=840 bgcolor=#E9E9E9
| 413840 ||  || — || September 24, 2006 || Anderson Mesa || LONEOS || — || align=right | 1.3 km || 
|-id=841 bgcolor=#E9E9E9
| 413841 ||  || — || September 24, 2006 || Kitt Peak || Spacewatch || — || align=right data-sort-value="0.71" | 710 m || 
|-id=842 bgcolor=#fefefe
| 413842 ||  || — || September 25, 2006 || Mount Lemmon || Mount Lemmon Survey || H || align=right data-sort-value="0.67" | 670 m || 
|-id=843 bgcolor=#d6d6d6
| 413843 ||  || — || September 18, 2006 || Kitt Peak || Spacewatch || 3:2 || align=right | 3.6 km || 
|-id=844 bgcolor=#fefefe
| 413844 ||  || — || September 19, 2006 || Kitt Peak || Spacewatch || — || align=right data-sort-value="0.71" | 710 m || 
|-id=845 bgcolor=#fefefe
| 413845 ||  || — || August 19, 2006 || Kitt Peak || Spacewatch || — || align=right data-sort-value="0.82" | 820 m || 
|-id=846 bgcolor=#fefefe
| 413846 ||  || — || September 15, 2006 || Kitt Peak || Spacewatch || — || align=right data-sort-value="0.97" | 970 m || 
|-id=847 bgcolor=#fefefe
| 413847 ||  || — || September 28, 2006 || Kitt Peak || Spacewatch || — || align=right | 1.1 km || 
|-id=848 bgcolor=#fefefe
| 413848 ||  || — || September 30, 2006 || Mount Lemmon || Mount Lemmon Survey || H || align=right data-sort-value="0.75" | 750 m || 
|-id=849 bgcolor=#E9E9E9
| 413849 ||  || — || September 30, 2006 || Mount Lemmon || Mount Lemmon Survey || — || align=right data-sort-value="0.91" | 910 m || 
|-id=850 bgcolor=#E9E9E9
| 413850 ||  || — || September 27, 2006 || Mount Lemmon || Mount Lemmon Survey || EUN || align=right | 1.4 km || 
|-id=851 bgcolor=#fefefe
| 413851 ||  || — || September 17, 2006 || Kitt Peak || Spacewatch || — || align=right data-sort-value="0.71" | 710 m || 
|-id=852 bgcolor=#E9E9E9
| 413852 ||  || — || September 18, 2006 || Kitt Peak || Spacewatch || — || align=right data-sort-value="0.62" | 620 m || 
|-id=853 bgcolor=#d6d6d6
| 413853 ||  || — || September 28, 2006 || Kitt Peak || Spacewatch || SHU3:2 || align=right | 4.5 km || 
|-id=854 bgcolor=#E9E9E9
| 413854 ||  || — || October 12, 2006 || Kitt Peak || Spacewatch || — || align=right data-sort-value="0.68" | 680 m || 
|-id=855 bgcolor=#E9E9E9
| 413855 ||  || — || October 12, 2006 || Kitt Peak || Spacewatch || — || align=right data-sort-value="0.83" | 830 m || 
|-id=856 bgcolor=#E9E9E9
| 413856 ||  || — || September 30, 2006 || Mount Lemmon || Mount Lemmon Survey || MAR || align=right data-sort-value="0.76" | 760 m || 
|-id=857 bgcolor=#E9E9E9
| 413857 ||  || — || October 13, 2006 || Kitt Peak || Spacewatch || — || align=right | 1.5 km || 
|-id=858 bgcolor=#fefefe
| 413858 ||  || — || September 30, 2006 || Catalina || CSS || H || align=right data-sort-value="0.59" | 590 m || 
|-id=859 bgcolor=#fefefe
| 413859 ||  || — || October 16, 2006 || Catalina || CSS || H || align=right data-sort-value="0.74" | 740 m || 
|-id=860 bgcolor=#E9E9E9
| 413860 ||  || — || October 16, 2006 || Kitt Peak || Spacewatch || — || align=right data-sort-value="0.76" | 760 m || 
|-id=861 bgcolor=#d6d6d6
| 413861 ||  || — || September 26, 2006 || Kitt Peak || Spacewatch || SHU3:2 || align=right | 5.1 km || 
|-id=862 bgcolor=#d6d6d6
| 413862 ||  || — || October 17, 2006 || Catalina || CSS || 3:2 || align=right | 4.8 km || 
|-id=863 bgcolor=#FA8072
| 413863 ||  || — || October 17, 2006 || Catalina || CSS || H || align=right data-sort-value="0.86" | 860 m || 
|-id=864 bgcolor=#E9E9E9
| 413864 ||  || — || September 30, 2006 || Mount Lemmon || Mount Lemmon Survey || — || align=right data-sort-value="0.71" | 710 m || 
|-id=865 bgcolor=#d6d6d6
| 413865 ||  || — || September 18, 2006 || Kitt Peak || Spacewatch || 3:2 || align=right | 3.7 km || 
|-id=866 bgcolor=#fefefe
| 413866 ||  || — || October 19, 2006 || Kitt Peak || Spacewatch || Hcritical || align=right data-sort-value="0.51" | 510 m || 
|-id=867 bgcolor=#E9E9E9
| 413867 ||  || — || October 2, 2006 || Mount Lemmon || Mount Lemmon Survey || — || align=right data-sort-value="0.78" | 780 m || 
|-id=868 bgcolor=#E9E9E9
| 413868 ||  || — || October 19, 2006 || Mount Lemmon || Mount Lemmon Survey || — || align=right data-sort-value="0.85" | 850 m || 
|-id=869 bgcolor=#E9E9E9
| 413869 ||  || — || October 20, 2006 || Mount Lemmon || Mount Lemmon Survey || — || align=right data-sort-value="0.65" | 650 m || 
|-id=870 bgcolor=#fefefe
| 413870 ||  || — || October 23, 2006 || Catalina || CSS || H || align=right | 1.0 km || 
|-id=871 bgcolor=#E9E9E9
| 413871 ||  || — || October 19, 2006 || Kitt Peak || Spacewatch || — || align=right data-sort-value="0.75" | 750 m || 
|-id=872 bgcolor=#fefefe
| 413872 ||  || — || October 16, 2006 || Catalina || CSS || — || align=right data-sort-value="0.91" | 910 m || 
|-id=873 bgcolor=#E9E9E9
| 413873 ||  || — || October 27, 2006 || Mount Lemmon || Mount Lemmon Survey || — || align=right data-sort-value="0.80" | 800 m || 
|-id=874 bgcolor=#E9E9E9
| 413874 ||  || — || October 29, 2006 || Mount Lemmon || Mount Lemmon Survey || — || align=right | 1.0 km || 
|-id=875 bgcolor=#E9E9E9
| 413875 ||  || — || October 27, 2006 || Catalina || CSS || — || align=right | 2.1 km || 
|-id=876 bgcolor=#fefefe
| 413876 ||  || — || October 27, 2006 || Mount Lemmon || Mount Lemmon Survey || H || align=right data-sort-value="0.80" | 800 m || 
|-id=877 bgcolor=#E9E9E9
| 413877 ||  || — || October 27, 2006 || Mount Lemmon || Mount Lemmon Survey || — || align=right data-sort-value="0.90" | 900 m || 
|-id=878 bgcolor=#E9E9E9
| 413878 ||  || — || October 28, 2006 || Kitt Peak || Spacewatch || — || align=right data-sort-value="0.81" | 810 m || 
|-id=879 bgcolor=#E9E9E9
| 413879 ||  || — || October 17, 2006 || Mount Lemmon || Mount Lemmon Survey || — || align=right | 1.0 km || 
|-id=880 bgcolor=#E9E9E9
| 413880 ||  || — || November 10, 2006 || Kitt Peak || Spacewatch || — || align=right | 1.9 km || 
|-id=881 bgcolor=#E9E9E9
| 413881 ||  || — || November 10, 2006 || Kitt Peak || Spacewatch || — || align=right | 1.1 km || 
|-id=882 bgcolor=#E9E9E9
| 413882 ||  || — || November 10, 2006 || Kitt Peak || Spacewatch || — || align=right data-sort-value="0.93" | 930 m || 
|-id=883 bgcolor=#E9E9E9
| 413883 ||  || — || October 22, 2006 || Mount Lemmon || Mount Lemmon Survey || — || align=right | 1.4 km || 
|-id=884 bgcolor=#E9E9E9
| 413884 ||  || — || September 28, 2006 || Mount Lemmon || Mount Lemmon Survey || (5) || align=right data-sort-value="0.81" | 810 m || 
|-id=885 bgcolor=#E9E9E9
| 413885 ||  || — || November 11, 2006 || Kitt Peak || Spacewatch || (5) || align=right data-sort-value="0.83" | 830 m || 
|-id=886 bgcolor=#E9E9E9
| 413886 ||  || — || November 12, 2006 || Mount Lemmon || Mount Lemmon Survey || — || align=right data-sort-value="0.90" | 900 m || 
|-id=887 bgcolor=#fefefe
| 413887 ||  || — || November 13, 2006 || Mount Lemmon || Mount Lemmon Survey || H || align=right data-sort-value="0.42" | 420 m || 
|-id=888 bgcolor=#E9E9E9
| 413888 ||  || — || November 10, 2006 || Kitt Peak || Spacewatch || — || align=right | 1.1 km || 
|-id=889 bgcolor=#E9E9E9
| 413889 ||  || — || September 30, 2006 || Mount Lemmon || Mount Lemmon Survey || — || align=right data-sort-value="0.86" | 860 m || 
|-id=890 bgcolor=#E9E9E9
| 413890 ||  || — || November 13, 2006 || Mount Lemmon || Mount Lemmon Survey || (5) || align=right data-sort-value="0.66" | 660 m || 
|-id=891 bgcolor=#E9E9E9
| 413891 ||  || — || November 14, 2006 || Kitt Peak || Spacewatch || — || align=right | 2.0 km || 
|-id=892 bgcolor=#E9E9E9
| 413892 ||  || — || October 20, 2006 || Mount Lemmon || Mount Lemmon Survey || — || align=right | 1.2 km || 
|-id=893 bgcolor=#E9E9E9
| 413893 ||  || — || November 15, 2006 || Kitt Peak || Spacewatch || — || align=right | 1.3 km || 
|-id=894 bgcolor=#fefefe
| 413894 ||  || — || November 15, 2006 || Kitt Peak || Spacewatch || H || align=right | 1.00 km || 
|-id=895 bgcolor=#E9E9E9
| 413895 ||  || — || October 29, 2006 || Catalina || CSS || MAR || align=right | 1.1 km || 
|-id=896 bgcolor=#E9E9E9
| 413896 ||  || — || November 15, 2006 || Catalina || CSS || — || align=right | 1.4 km || 
|-id=897 bgcolor=#E9E9E9
| 413897 ||  || — || November 11, 2006 || Kitt Peak || Spacewatch || (5) || align=right | 1.0 km || 
|-id=898 bgcolor=#E9E9E9
| 413898 ||  || — || September 27, 2006 || Mount Lemmon || Mount Lemmon Survey || — || align=right | 1.0 km || 
|-id=899 bgcolor=#d6d6d6
| 413899 ||  || — || November 16, 2006 || Kitt Peak || Spacewatch || 3:2 || align=right | 3.7 km || 
|-id=900 bgcolor=#E9E9E9
| 413900 ||  || — || November 16, 2006 || Kitt Peak || Spacewatch || — || align=right data-sort-value="0.94" | 940 m || 
|}

413901–414000 

|-bgcolor=#E9E9E9
| 413901 ||  || — || November 16, 2006 || Kitt Peak || Spacewatch || — || align=right data-sort-value="0.80" | 800 m || 
|-id=902 bgcolor=#E9E9E9
| 413902 ||  || — || October 4, 2006 || Mount Lemmon || Mount Lemmon Survey || — || align=right | 1.1 km || 
|-id=903 bgcolor=#E9E9E9
| 413903 ||  || — || November 17, 2006 || Mount Lemmon || Mount Lemmon Survey || — || align=right data-sort-value="0.80" | 800 m || 
|-id=904 bgcolor=#E9E9E9
| 413904 ||  || — || November 17, 2006 || Mount Lemmon || Mount Lemmon Survey || — || align=right | 1.1 km || 
|-id=905 bgcolor=#fefefe
| 413905 ||  || — || November 18, 2006 || Socorro || LINEAR || H || align=right | 1.0 km || 
|-id=906 bgcolor=#E9E9E9
| 413906 ||  || — || November 18, 2006 || Catalina || CSS || — || align=right | 1.3 km || 
|-id=907 bgcolor=#FA8072
| 413907 ||  || — || November 22, 2006 || Mount Lemmon || Mount Lemmon Survey || — || align=right | 3.4 km || 
|-id=908 bgcolor=#E9E9E9
| 413908 ||  || — || November 16, 2006 || Kitt Peak || Spacewatch || — || align=right | 1.5 km || 
|-id=909 bgcolor=#E9E9E9
| 413909 ||  || — || September 28, 2006 || Mount Lemmon || Mount Lemmon Survey || — || align=right | 1.4 km || 
|-id=910 bgcolor=#E9E9E9
| 413910 ||  || — || November 16, 2006 || Mount Lemmon || Mount Lemmon Survey || — || align=right | 1.1 km || 
|-id=911 bgcolor=#E9E9E9
| 413911 ||  || — || November 17, 2006 || Socorro || LINEAR || — || align=right | 2.0 km || 
|-id=912 bgcolor=#E9E9E9
| 413912 ||  || — || October 23, 2006 || Mount Lemmon || Mount Lemmon Survey || (194) || align=right | 2.6 km || 
|-id=913 bgcolor=#E9E9E9
| 413913 ||  || — || November 18, 2006 || Kitt Peak || Spacewatch || — || align=right | 1.00 km || 
|-id=914 bgcolor=#E9E9E9
| 413914 ||  || — || November 11, 2006 || Kitt Peak || Spacewatch || — || align=right | 1.2 km || 
|-id=915 bgcolor=#E9E9E9
| 413915 ||  || — || November 19, 2006 || Kitt Peak || Spacewatch || — || align=right data-sort-value="0.93" | 930 m || 
|-id=916 bgcolor=#E9E9E9
| 413916 ||  || — || October 27, 2006 || Mount Lemmon || Mount Lemmon Survey || — || align=right data-sort-value="0.77" | 770 m || 
|-id=917 bgcolor=#E9E9E9
| 413917 ||  || — || October 31, 2006 || Mount Lemmon || Mount Lemmon Survey || — || align=right | 1.9 km || 
|-id=918 bgcolor=#fefefe
| 413918 ||  || — || November 20, 2006 || Catalina || CSS || NYS || align=right data-sort-value="0.69" | 690 m || 
|-id=919 bgcolor=#E9E9E9
| 413919 ||  || — || November 22, 2006 || Catalina || CSS || — || align=right | 2.6 km || 
|-id=920 bgcolor=#E9E9E9
| 413920 ||  || — || November 18, 2006 || Kitt Peak || Spacewatch || (5) || align=right | 1.00 km || 
|-id=921 bgcolor=#E9E9E9
| 413921 ||  || — || October 4, 2006 || Mount Lemmon || Mount Lemmon Survey || — || align=right data-sort-value="0.98" | 980 m || 
|-id=922 bgcolor=#d6d6d6
| 413922 ||  || — || November 21, 2006 || Mount Lemmon || Mount Lemmon Survey || 3:2 || align=right | 3.8 km || 
|-id=923 bgcolor=#E9E9E9
| 413923 ||  || — || November 22, 2006 || Kitt Peak || Spacewatch || — || align=right | 1.2 km || 
|-id=924 bgcolor=#E9E9E9
| 413924 ||  || — || October 31, 2006 || Mount Lemmon || Mount Lemmon Survey || — || align=right | 1.7 km || 
|-id=925 bgcolor=#E9E9E9
| 413925 ||  || — || October 31, 2006 || Mount Lemmon || Mount Lemmon Survey || — || align=right | 1.8 km || 
|-id=926 bgcolor=#E9E9E9
| 413926 ||  || — || November 11, 2006 || Mount Lemmon || Mount Lemmon Survey || — || align=right | 1.4 km || 
|-id=927 bgcolor=#E9E9E9
| 413927 ||  || — || November 11, 2006 || Kitt Peak || Spacewatch || — || align=right data-sort-value="0.87" | 870 m || 
|-id=928 bgcolor=#E9E9E9
| 413928 ||  || — || November 23, 2006 || Kitt Peak || Spacewatch || EUN || align=right | 1.1 km || 
|-id=929 bgcolor=#E9E9E9
| 413929 ||  || — || December 9, 2006 || Kitt Peak || Spacewatch || — || align=right | 1.3 km || 
|-id=930 bgcolor=#E9E9E9
| 413930 ||  || — || December 9, 2006 || Kitt Peak || Spacewatch || — || align=right | 1.3 km || 
|-id=931 bgcolor=#E9E9E9
| 413931 ||  || — || December 10, 2006 || Kitt Peak || Spacewatch || — || align=right data-sort-value="0.95" | 950 m || 
|-id=932 bgcolor=#E9E9E9
| 413932 ||  || — || December 1, 2006 || Mount Lemmon || Mount Lemmon Survey || EUN || align=right | 1.1 km || 
|-id=933 bgcolor=#E9E9E9
| 413933 ||  || — || October 28, 2006 || Mount Lemmon || Mount Lemmon Survey || — || align=right | 1.1 km || 
|-id=934 bgcolor=#E9E9E9
| 413934 ||  || — || December 1, 2006 || Mount Lemmon || Mount Lemmon Survey || — || align=right | 1.3 km || 
|-id=935 bgcolor=#E9E9E9
| 413935 ||  || — || December 13, 2006 || Mount Lemmon || Mount Lemmon Survey || — || align=right | 2.0 km || 
|-id=936 bgcolor=#fefefe
| 413936 ||  || — || November 21, 2006 || Catalina || CSS || H || align=right | 1.2 km || 
|-id=937 bgcolor=#E9E9E9
| 413937 ||  || — || December 15, 2006 || Kitt Peak || Spacewatch || — || align=right | 2.3 km || 
|-id=938 bgcolor=#E9E9E9
| 413938 ||  || — || December 13, 2006 || Mount Lemmon || Mount Lemmon Survey || — || align=right | 1.5 km || 
|-id=939 bgcolor=#E9E9E9
| 413939 ||  || — || September 28, 2006 || Mount Lemmon || Mount Lemmon Survey || — || align=right | 1.5 km || 
|-id=940 bgcolor=#E9E9E9
| 413940 ||  || — || December 25, 2006 || Desert Moon || B. L. Stevens || — || align=right | 1.5 km || 
|-id=941 bgcolor=#E9E9E9
| 413941 ||  || — || December 24, 2006 || Bergisch Gladbac || W. Bickel || (5) || align=right data-sort-value="0.73" | 730 m || 
|-id=942 bgcolor=#E9E9E9
| 413942 ||  || — || December 14, 2006 || Socorro || LINEAR || — || align=right | 1.6 km || 
|-id=943 bgcolor=#E9E9E9
| 413943 ||  || — || December 21, 2006 || Kitt Peak || Spacewatch || — || align=right | 2.1 km || 
|-id=944 bgcolor=#E9E9E9
| 413944 ||  || — || December 13, 2006 || Socorro || LINEAR || EUN || align=right | 1.3 km || 
|-id=945 bgcolor=#E9E9E9
| 413945 ||  || — || December 22, 2006 || Socorro || LINEAR || — || align=right | 1.3 km || 
|-id=946 bgcolor=#fefefe
| 413946 ||  || — || December 26, 2006 || Catalina || CSS || H || align=right | 1.1 km || 
|-id=947 bgcolor=#E9E9E9
| 413947 ||  || — || December 24, 2006 || Kitt Peak || Spacewatch || — || align=right data-sort-value="0.95" | 950 m || 
|-id=948 bgcolor=#E9E9E9
| 413948 ||  || — || January 9, 2007 || Mount Lemmon || Mount Lemmon Survey || (5) || align=right data-sort-value="0.83" | 830 m || 
|-id=949 bgcolor=#FA8072
| 413949 ||  || — || November 15, 2006 || Mount Lemmon || Mount Lemmon Survey || — || align=right | 1.1 km || 
|-id=950 bgcolor=#E9E9E9
| 413950 ||  || — || January 9, 2007 || Mount Lemmon || Mount Lemmon Survey || HOF || align=right | 2.6 km || 
|-id=951 bgcolor=#E9E9E9
| 413951 ||  || — || January 17, 2007 || Kitt Peak || Spacewatch || — || align=right | 2.5 km || 
|-id=952 bgcolor=#E9E9E9
| 413952 ||  || — || March 9, 2003 || Kitt Peak || Spacewatch || — || align=right | 1.1 km || 
|-id=953 bgcolor=#E9E9E9
| 413953 ||  || — || January 24, 2007 || Mount Lemmon || Mount Lemmon Survey || — || align=right | 2.0 km || 
|-id=954 bgcolor=#E9E9E9
| 413954 ||  || — || January 24, 2007 || Mount Lemmon || Mount Lemmon Survey || — || align=right | 1.4 km || 
|-id=955 bgcolor=#E9E9E9
| 413955 ||  || — || January 26, 2007 || Anderson Mesa || LONEOS || — || align=right | 2.5 km || 
|-id=956 bgcolor=#E9E9E9
| 413956 ||  || — || January 26, 2007 || Kitt Peak || Spacewatch || — || align=right | 1.8 km || 
|-id=957 bgcolor=#E9E9E9
| 413957 ||  || — || November 21, 2006 || Mount Lemmon || Mount Lemmon Survey || — || align=right | 2.0 km || 
|-id=958 bgcolor=#E9E9E9
| 413958 ||  || — || January 19, 2007 || Mauna Kea || Mauna Kea Obs. || MIS || align=right | 2.3 km || 
|-id=959 bgcolor=#E9E9E9
| 413959 ||  || — || January 25, 2007 || Catalina || CSS || — || align=right | 1.4 km || 
|-id=960 bgcolor=#E9E9E9
| 413960 ||  || — || January 28, 2007 || Catalina || CSS || — || align=right | 2.3 km || 
|-id=961 bgcolor=#E9E9E9
| 413961 ||  || — || February 6, 2007 || Mount Lemmon || Mount Lemmon Survey || — || align=right | 1.2 km || 
|-id=962 bgcolor=#E9E9E9
| 413962 ||  || — || February 6, 2007 || Palomar || NEAT || EUN || align=right | 1.8 km || 
|-id=963 bgcolor=#E9E9E9
| 413963 ||  || — || February 5, 2007 || Palomar || NEAT || EUN || align=right | 1.3 km || 
|-id=964 bgcolor=#E9E9E9
| 413964 ||  || — || November 22, 2006 || Mount Lemmon || Mount Lemmon Survey || — || align=right | 1.5 km || 
|-id=965 bgcolor=#E9E9E9
| 413965 ||  || — || February 6, 2007 || Mount Lemmon || Mount Lemmon Survey || HOF || align=right | 2.5 km || 
|-id=966 bgcolor=#E9E9E9
| 413966 ||  || — || February 6, 2007 || Mount Lemmon || Mount Lemmon Survey || — || align=right | 2.4 km || 
|-id=967 bgcolor=#E9E9E9
| 413967 ||  || — || February 6, 2007 || Mount Lemmon || Mount Lemmon Survey || — || align=right | 1.3 km || 
|-id=968 bgcolor=#E9E9E9
| 413968 ||  || — || February 7, 2007 || Palomar || NEAT || — || align=right | 1.4 km || 
|-id=969 bgcolor=#E9E9E9
| 413969 ||  || — || February 19, 2007 || Bisei SG Center || BATTeRS || — || align=right | 1.9 km || 
|-id=970 bgcolor=#E9E9E9
| 413970 ||  || — || February 17, 2007 || Kitt Peak || Spacewatch || — || align=right | 2.2 km || 
|-id=971 bgcolor=#E9E9E9
| 413971 ||  || — || February 17, 2007 || Kitt Peak || Spacewatch || — || align=right | 1.3 km || 
|-id=972 bgcolor=#E9E9E9
| 413972 ||  || — || February 17, 2007 || Kitt Peak || Spacewatch || — || align=right | 2.1 km || 
|-id=973 bgcolor=#E9E9E9
| 413973 ||  || — || February 17, 2007 || Kitt Peak || Spacewatch || — || align=right | 2.7 km || 
|-id=974 bgcolor=#E9E9E9
| 413974 ||  || — || December 24, 2006 || Mount Lemmon || Mount Lemmon Survey || DOR || align=right | 3.1 km || 
|-id=975 bgcolor=#E9E9E9
| 413975 ||  || — || February 21, 2007 || Kitt Peak || Spacewatch || — || align=right | 2.3 km || 
|-id=976 bgcolor=#E9E9E9
| 413976 ||  || — || February 21, 2007 || Mount Lemmon || Mount Lemmon Survey || — || align=right | 2.1 km || 
|-id=977 bgcolor=#E9E9E9
| 413977 ||  || — || February 21, 2007 || Mount Lemmon || Mount Lemmon Survey || — || align=right | 1.8 km || 
|-id=978 bgcolor=#E9E9E9
| 413978 ||  || — || February 21, 2007 || Mount Lemmon || Mount Lemmon Survey || — || align=right | 2.0 km || 
|-id=979 bgcolor=#E9E9E9
| 413979 ||  || — || January 27, 2007 || Mount Lemmon || Mount Lemmon Survey || — || align=right | 1.8 km || 
|-id=980 bgcolor=#E9E9E9
| 413980 ||  || — || February 16, 2007 || Mount Lemmon || Mount Lemmon Survey || — || align=right | 1.7 km || 
|-id=981 bgcolor=#E9E9E9
| 413981 ||  || — || February 16, 2007 || Catalina || CSS || — || align=right | 2.9 km || 
|-id=982 bgcolor=#E9E9E9
| 413982 ||  || — || March 9, 2007 || Mount Lemmon || Mount Lemmon Survey || — || align=right | 2.2 km || 
|-id=983 bgcolor=#E9E9E9
| 413983 ||  || — || January 25, 2007 || Kitt Peak || Spacewatch || — || align=right | 1.6 km || 
|-id=984 bgcolor=#E9E9E9
| 413984 ||  || — || November 23, 2006 || Mount Lemmon || Mount Lemmon Survey || — || align=right | 1.0 km || 
|-id=985 bgcolor=#E9E9E9
| 413985 ||  || — || March 9, 2007 || Kitt Peak || Spacewatch || AGN || align=right | 1.3 km || 
|-id=986 bgcolor=#E9E9E9
| 413986 ||  || — || March 9, 2007 || Palomar || NEAT || — || align=right | 2.0 km || 
|-id=987 bgcolor=#E9E9E9
| 413987 ||  || — || March 10, 2007 || Kitt Peak || Spacewatch || — || align=right | 1.3 km || 
|-id=988 bgcolor=#E9E9E9
| 413988 ||  || — || March 10, 2007 || Kitt Peak || Spacewatch || — || align=right | 2.2 km || 
|-id=989 bgcolor=#FFC2E0
| 413989 ||  || — || March 14, 2007 || Siding Spring || SSS || APOPHA || align=right data-sort-value="0.53" | 530 m || 
|-id=990 bgcolor=#d6d6d6
| 413990 ||  || — || March 11, 2007 || Kitt Peak || Spacewatch || — || align=right | 3.1 km || 
|-id=991 bgcolor=#E9E9E9
| 413991 ||  || — || March 11, 2007 || Kitt Peak || Spacewatch || — || align=right | 2.4 km || 
|-id=992 bgcolor=#d6d6d6
| 413992 ||  || — || March 12, 2007 || Mount Lemmon || Mount Lemmon Survey || EUP || align=right | 4.8 km || 
|-id=993 bgcolor=#E9E9E9
| 413993 ||  || — || March 13, 2007 || Gnosca || S. Sposetti || — || align=right | 2.7 km || 
|-id=994 bgcolor=#E9E9E9
| 413994 ||  || — || March 12, 2007 || Mount Lemmon || Mount Lemmon Survey || — || align=right | 1.9 km || 
|-id=995 bgcolor=#E9E9E9
| 413995 ||  || — || March 13, 2007 || Mount Lemmon || Mount Lemmon Survey || — || align=right | 1.3 km || 
|-id=996 bgcolor=#d6d6d6
| 413996 ||  || — || March 13, 2007 || Mount Lemmon || Mount Lemmon Survey || KOR || align=right | 1.1 km || 
|-id=997 bgcolor=#d6d6d6
| 413997 ||  || — || March 13, 2007 || Kitt Peak || Spacewatch || THM || align=right | 2.3 km || 
|-id=998 bgcolor=#E9E9E9
| 413998 ||  || — || August 30, 2000 || Kitt Peak || Spacewatch || — || align=right | 2.5 km || 
|-id=999 bgcolor=#d6d6d6
| 413999 ||  || — || March 15, 2007 || Kitt Peak || Spacewatch || BRA || align=right | 1.4 km || 
|-id=000 bgcolor=#E9E9E9
| 414000 ||  || — || February 21, 2007 || Kitt Peak || Spacewatch || HOF || align=right | 2.8 km || 
|}

References

External links 
 Discovery Circumstances: Numbered Minor Planets (410001)–(415000) (IAU Minor Planet Center)

0413